

613001–613100 

|-bgcolor=#FA8072
| 613001 ||  || — || July 6, 2005 || Kitt Peak || Spacewatch ||  || align=right data-sort-value="0.71" | 710 m || 
|-id=002 bgcolor=#FA8072
| 613002 ||  || — || July 5, 2005 || Mount Lemmon || Mount Lemmon Survey || Tj (2.97) || align=right | 1.8 km || 
|-id=003 bgcolor=#FA8072
| 613003 ||  || — || July 9, 2005 || Kitt Peak || Spacewatch ||  || align=right data-sort-value="0.50" | 500 m || 
|-id=004 bgcolor=#fefefe
| 613004 ||  || — || July 9, 2005 || Kitt Peak || Spacewatch ||  || align=right data-sort-value="0.53" | 530 m || 
|-id=005 bgcolor=#fefefe
| 613005 ||  || — || July 9, 2005 || Kitt Peak || Spacewatch ||  || align=right data-sort-value="0.45" | 450 m || 
|-id=006 bgcolor=#fefefe
| 613006 ||  || — || July 10, 2005 || Kitt Peak || Spacewatch ||  || align=right data-sort-value="0.57" | 570 m || 
|-id=007 bgcolor=#d6d6d6
| 613007 ||  || — || July 4, 2005 || Kitt Peak || Spacewatch || Tj (2.95) || align=right | 2.6 km || 
|-id=008 bgcolor=#d6d6d6
| 613008 ||  || — || July 6, 2005 || Kitt Peak || Spacewatch || 3:2 || align=right | 3.1 km || 
|-id=009 bgcolor=#d6d6d6
| 613009 ||  || — || July 3, 2005 || Palomar || NEAT ||  || align=right | 2.3 km || 
|-id=010 bgcolor=#FFC2E0
| 613010 ||  || — || July 27, 2005 || Palomar || NEAT || ATEcritical || align=right data-sort-value="0.32" | 320 m || 
|-id=011 bgcolor=#d6d6d6
| 613011 ||  || — || July 29, 2005 || Palomar || NEAT ||  || align=right | 2.1 km || 
|-id=012 bgcolor=#d6d6d6
| 613012 ||  || — || July 30, 2005 || Palomar || NEAT ||  || align=right | 3.0 km || 
|-id=013 bgcolor=#E9E9E9
| 613013 ||  || — || August 7, 2005 || Reedy Creek || J. Broughton ||  || align=right | 3.1 km || 
|-id=014 bgcolor=#FFC2E0
| 613014 ||  || — || August 27, 2005 || Anderson Mesa || LONEOS || AMOcritical || align=right data-sort-value="0.61" | 610 m || 
|-id=015 bgcolor=#d6d6d6
| 613015 ||  || — || August 25, 2005 || Palomar || NEAT ||  || align=right | 1.5 km || 
|-id=016 bgcolor=#d6d6d6
| 613016 ||  || — || August 29, 2005 || Saint-Sulpice || B. Christophe ||  || align=right | 2.2 km || 
|-id=017 bgcolor=#fefefe
| 613017 ||  || — || August 29, 2005 || Vicques || Jura Obs. ||  || align=right data-sort-value="0.68" | 680 m || 
|-id=018 bgcolor=#fefefe
| 613018 ||  || — || August 29, 2005 || Anderson Mesa || LONEOS ||  || align=right | 1.8 km || 
|-id=019 bgcolor=#E9E9E9
| 613019 ||  || — || August 27, 2005 || Palomar || NEAT ||  || align=right data-sort-value="0.68" | 680 m || 
|-id=020 bgcolor=#fefefe
| 613020 ||  || — || August 28, 2005 || Kitt Peak || Spacewatch || NYS || align=right data-sort-value="0.71" | 710 m || 
|-id=021 bgcolor=#d6d6d6
| 613021 ||  || — || August 28, 2005 || Kitt Peak || Spacewatch ||  || align=right | 1.8 km || 
|-id=022 bgcolor=#fefefe
| 613022 ||  || — || August 28, 2005 || Kitt Peak || Spacewatch ||  || align=right data-sort-value="0.41" | 410 m || 
|-id=023 bgcolor=#d6d6d6
| 613023 ||  || — || August 28, 2005 || Kitt Peak || Spacewatch || THM || align=right | 2.1 km || 
|-id=024 bgcolor=#d6d6d6
| 613024 ||  || — || August 28, 2005 || Kitt Peak || Spacewatch ||  || align=right | 2.1 km || 
|-id=025 bgcolor=#fefefe
| 613025 ||  || — || August 28, 2005 || Kitt Peak || Spacewatch || NYS || align=right data-sort-value="0.48" | 480 m || 
|-id=026 bgcolor=#fefefe
| 613026 ||  || — || August 28, 2005 || Kitt Peak || Spacewatch ||  || align=right data-sort-value="0.59" | 590 m || 
|-id=027 bgcolor=#fefefe
| 613027 ||  || — || August 28, 2005 || Kitt Peak || Spacewatch ||  || align=right data-sort-value="0.59" | 590 m || 
|-id=028 bgcolor=#E9E9E9
| 613028 ||  || — || August 29, 2005 || Palomar || NEAT ||  || align=right | 1.1 km || 
|-id=029 bgcolor=#E9E9E9
| 613029 ||  || — || August 31, 2005 || Socorro || LINEAR || EUN || align=right | 1.7 km || 
|-id=030 bgcolor=#d6d6d6
| 613030 ||  || — || August 27, 2005 || Palomar || NEAT ||  || align=right | 1.8 km || 
|-id=031 bgcolor=#d6d6d6
| 613031 ||  || — || September 3, 2005 || Bergisch Gladbach || W. Bickel || Tj (2.98) || align=right | 3.0 km || 
|-id=032 bgcolor=#fefefe
| 613032 ||  || — || September 1, 2005 || Kitt Peak || Spacewatch ||  || align=right data-sort-value="0.53" | 530 m || 
|-id=033 bgcolor=#fefefe
| 613033 ||  || — || September 1, 2005 || Kitt Peak || Spacewatch || NYS || align=right data-sort-value="0.68" | 680 m || 
|-id=034 bgcolor=#d6d6d6
| 613034 ||  || — || September 1, 2005 || Kitt Peak || Spacewatch || 3:2 || align=right | 3.7 km || 
|-id=035 bgcolor=#E9E9E9
| 613035 ||  || — || September 3, 2005 || Palomar || NEAT ||  || align=right | 1.0 km || 
|-id=036 bgcolor=#E9E9E9
| 613036 ||  || — || September 12, 2005 || Junk Bond || D. Healy || DOR || align=right | 1.5 km || 
|-id=037 bgcolor=#C2E0FF
| 613037 ||  || — || September 3, 2005 || Apache Point || Apache Point Obs. || res2:11 || align=right | 274 km || 
|-id=038 bgcolor=#FA8072
| 613038 ||  || — || September 13, 2005 || Kitt Peak || Spacewatch ||  || align=right data-sort-value="0.35" | 350 m || 
|-id=039 bgcolor=#fefefe
| 613039 ||  || — || September 21, 2005 || Marly || Naef Obs. ||  || align=right data-sort-value="0.68" | 680 m || 
|-id=040 bgcolor=#fefefe
| 613040 ||  || — || September 24, 2005 || Mount Graham || W. H. Ryan, C. T. Martinez ||  || align=right data-sort-value="0.65" | 650 m || 
|-id=041 bgcolor=#E9E9E9
| 613041 ||  || — || September 22, 2005 || Palomar || NEAT ||  || align=right data-sort-value="0.58" | 580 m || 
|-id=042 bgcolor=#E9E9E9
| 613042 ||  || — || September 23, 2005 || Kitt Peak || Spacewatch ||  || align=right | 1.7 km || 
|-id=043 bgcolor=#d6d6d6
| 613043 ||  || — || September 24, 2005 || Kitt Peak || Spacewatch || EOS || align=right | 2.1 km || 
|-id=044 bgcolor=#fefefe
| 613044 ||  || — || September 24, 2005 || Kitt Peak || Spacewatch || MAS || align=right data-sort-value="0.48" | 480 m || 
|-id=045 bgcolor=#d6d6d6
| 613045 ||  || — || September 26, 2005 || Kitt Peak || Spacewatch ||  || align=right | 2.2 km || 
|-id=046 bgcolor=#d6d6d6
| 613046 ||  || — || September 26, 2005 || Kitt Peak || Spacewatch ||  || align=right | 2.2 km || 
|-id=047 bgcolor=#fefefe
| 613047 ||  || — || September 23, 2005 || Kitt Peak || Spacewatch ||  || align=right data-sort-value="0.68" | 680 m || 
|-id=048 bgcolor=#E9E9E9
| 613048 ||  || — || September 23, 2005 || Kitt Peak || Spacewatch ||  || align=right data-sort-value="0.66" | 660 m || 
|-id=049 bgcolor=#fefefe
| 613049 ||  || — || September 24, 2005 || Kitt Peak || Spacewatch ||  || align=right | 1.1 km || 
|-id=050 bgcolor=#d6d6d6
| 613050 ||  || — || September 24, 2005 || Kitt Peak || Spacewatch ||  || align=right | 1.6 km || 
|-id=051 bgcolor=#fefefe
| 613051 ||  || — || September 26, 2005 || Kitt Peak || Spacewatch || MAS || align=right data-sort-value="0.56" | 560 m || 
|-id=052 bgcolor=#fefefe
| 613052 ||  || — || September 27, 2005 || Kitt Peak || Spacewatch || V || align=right data-sort-value="0.53" | 530 m || 
|-id=053 bgcolor=#fefefe
| 613053 ||  || — || September 24, 2005 || Kitt Peak || Spacewatch ||  || align=right data-sort-value="0.48" | 480 m || 
|-id=054 bgcolor=#FA8072
| 613054 ||  || — || September 24, 2005 || Kitt Peak || Spacewatch ||  || align=right data-sort-value="0.55" | 550 m || 
|-id=055 bgcolor=#E9E9E9
| 613055 ||  || — || September 24, 2005 || Kitt Peak || Spacewatch ||  || align=right | 1.1 km || 
|-id=056 bgcolor=#E9E9E9
| 613056 ||  || — || September 24, 2005 || Kitt Peak || Spacewatch ||  || align=right | 1.8 km || 
|-id=057 bgcolor=#d6d6d6
| 613057 ||  || — || September 25, 2005 || Kitt Peak || Spacewatch ||  || align=right | 1.8 km || 
|-id=058 bgcolor=#d6d6d6
| 613058 ||  || — || September 25, 2005 || Palomar || NEAT ||  || align=right | 1.5 km || 
|-id=059 bgcolor=#d6d6d6
| 613059 ||  || — || September 25, 2005 || Kitt Peak || Spacewatch ||  || align=right | 2.9 km || 
|-id=060 bgcolor=#d6d6d6
| 613060 ||  || — || September 25, 2005 || Kitt Peak || Spacewatch ||  || align=right | 2.0 km || 
|-id=061 bgcolor=#d6d6d6
| 613061 ||  || — || September 25, 2005 || Palomar || NEAT ||  || align=right | 2.5 km || 
|-id=062 bgcolor=#d6d6d6
| 613062 ||  || — || September 26, 2005 || Kitt Peak || Spacewatch ||  || align=right | 1.8 km || 
|-id=063 bgcolor=#fefefe
| 613063 ||  || — || September 27, 2005 || Kitt Peak || Spacewatch ||  || align=right data-sort-value="0.55" | 550 m || 
|-id=064 bgcolor=#E9E9E9
| 613064 ||  || — || September 28, 2005 || Palomar || NEAT ||  || align=right | 1.7 km || 
|-id=065 bgcolor=#E9E9E9
| 613065 ||  || — || September 29, 2005 || Kitt Peak || Spacewatch ||  || align=right | 1.2 km || 
|-id=066 bgcolor=#E9E9E9
| 613066 ||  || — || September 29, 2005 || Anderson Mesa || LONEOS ||  || align=right data-sort-value="0.74" | 740 m || 
|-id=067 bgcolor=#d6d6d6
| 613067 ||  || — || September 30, 2005 || Catalina || CSS ||  || align=right | 2.4 km || 
|-id=068 bgcolor=#E9E9E9
| 613068 ||  || — || September 24, 2005 || Kitt Peak || Spacewatch ||  || align=right | 1.4 km || 
|-id=069 bgcolor=#d6d6d6
| 613069 ||  || — || September 24, 2005 || Kitt Peak || Spacewatch ||  || align=right | 2.7 km || 
|-id=070 bgcolor=#d6d6d6
| 613070 ||  || — || September 25, 2005 || Kitt Peak || Spacewatch || EUP || align=right | 3.5 km || 
|-id=071 bgcolor=#E9E9E9
| 613071 ||  || — || September 25, 2005 || Kitt Peak || Spacewatch || GEF || align=right | 2.1 km || 
|-id=072 bgcolor=#d6d6d6
| 613072 ||  || — || September 26, 2005 || Kitt Peak || Spacewatch ||  || align=right | 2.6 km || 
|-id=073 bgcolor=#E9E9E9
| 613073 ||  || — || September 26, 2005 || Kitt Peak || Spacewatch ||  || align=right | 1.2 km || 
|-id=074 bgcolor=#d6d6d6
| 613074 ||  || — || September 26, 2005 || Palomar || NEAT ||  || align=right | 2.5 km || 
|-id=075 bgcolor=#fefefe
| 613075 ||  || — || September 29, 2005 || Kitt Peak || Spacewatch ||  || align=right data-sort-value="0.65" | 650 m || 
|-id=076 bgcolor=#d6d6d6
| 613076 ||  || — || September 29, 2005 || Kitt Peak || Spacewatch ||  || align=right | 1.5 km || 
|-id=077 bgcolor=#d6d6d6
| 613077 ||  || — || September 29, 2005 || Mount Lemmon || Mount Lemmon Survey ||  || align=right | 1.5 km || 
|-id=078 bgcolor=#fefefe
| 613078 ||  || — || September 29, 2005 || Mount Lemmon || Mount Lemmon Survey ||  || align=right data-sort-value="0.39" | 390 m || 
|-id=079 bgcolor=#fefefe
| 613079 ||  || — || September 29, 2005 || Mount Lemmon || Mount Lemmon Survey ||  || align=right data-sort-value="0.51" | 510 m || 
|-id=080 bgcolor=#d6d6d6
| 613080 ||  || — || September 30, 2005 || Mount Lemmon || Mount Lemmon Survey ||  || align=right | 2.0 km || 
|-id=081 bgcolor=#fefefe
| 613081 ||  || — || September 30, 2005 || Mount Lemmon || Mount Lemmon Survey ||  || align=right data-sort-value="0.50" | 500 m || 
|-id=082 bgcolor=#fefefe
| 613082 ||  || — || September 30, 2005 || Kitt Peak || Spacewatch ||  || align=right data-sort-value="0.60" | 600 m || 
|-id=083 bgcolor=#fefefe
| 613083 ||  || — || September 30, 2005 || Mount Lemmon || Mount Lemmon Survey ||  || align=right data-sort-value="0.47" | 470 m || 
|-id=084 bgcolor=#FA8072
| 613084 ||  || — || September 23, 2005 || Kitt Peak || Spacewatch ||  || align=right data-sort-value="0.49" | 490 m || 
|-id=085 bgcolor=#fefefe
| 613085 ||  || — || September 25, 2005 || Kitt Peak || Spacewatch || MAS || align=right data-sort-value="0.45" | 450 m || 
|-id=086 bgcolor=#fefefe
| 613086 ||  || — || September 30, 2005 || Kitt Peak || Spacewatch ||  || align=right data-sort-value="0.68" | 680 m || 
|-id=087 bgcolor=#C2E0FF
| 613087 ||  || — || September 26, 2005 || Apache Point || Apache Point Obs. || res3:5critical || align=right | 160 km || 
|-id=088 bgcolor=#d6d6d6
| 613088 ||  || — || September 23, 2005 || Kitt Peak || Spacewatch || THM || align=right | 2.4 km || 
|-id=089 bgcolor=#d6d6d6
| 613089 ||  || — || September 21, 2005 || Apache Point || A. C. Becker ||  || align=right | 2.0 km || 
|-id=090 bgcolor=#fefefe
| 613090 ||  || — || September 24, 2005 || Apache Point || A. C. Becker ||  || align=right data-sort-value="0.79" | 790 m || 
|-id=091 bgcolor=#d6d6d6
| 613091 ||  || — || September 26, 2005 || Apache Point || A. C. Becker ||  || align=right | 1.6 km || 
|-id=092 bgcolor=#d6d6d6
| 613092 ||  || — || September 26, 2005 || Kitt Peak || Spacewatch ||  || align=right | 1.8 km || 
|-id=093 bgcolor=#fefefe
| 613093 ||  || — || October 1, 2005 || Kitt Peak || Spacewatch ||  || align=right data-sort-value="0.62" | 620 m || 
|-id=094 bgcolor=#E9E9E9
| 613094 ||  || — || October 1, 2005 || Kitt Peak || Spacewatch ||  || align=right data-sort-value="0.67" | 670 m || 
|-id=095 bgcolor=#d6d6d6
| 613095 ||  || — || October 5, 2005 || Socorro || LINEAR ||  || align=right | 2.1 km || 
|-id=096 bgcolor=#FFC2E0
| 613096 ||  || — || October 7, 2005 || Socorro || LINEAR || AMO || align=right data-sort-value="0.58" | 580 m || 
|-id=097 bgcolor=#fefefe
| 613097 ||  || — || October 6, 2005 || Kitt Peak || Spacewatch ||  || align=right data-sort-value="0.55" | 550 m || 
|-id=098 bgcolor=#d6d6d6
| 613098 ||  || — || October 3, 2005 || Kitt Peak || Spacewatch ||  || align=right | 2.1 km || 
|-id=099 bgcolor=#fefefe
| 613099 ||  || — || October 6, 2005 || Mount Lemmon || Mount Lemmon Survey ||  || align=right data-sort-value="0.69" | 690 m || 
|-id=100 bgcolor=#C2E0FF
| 613100 ||  || — || October 8, 2005 || Las Campanas || C. Trujillo, S. S. Sheppard || res3:5critical || align=right | 138 km || 
|}

613101–613200 

|-bgcolor=#d6d6d6
| 613101 ||  || — || October 5, 2005 || Kitt Peak || Spacewatch ||  || align=right | 1.8 km || 
|-id=102 bgcolor=#fefefe
| 613102 ||  || — || October 5, 2005 || Mount Lemmon || Mount Lemmon Survey ||  || align=right data-sort-value="0.55" | 550 m || 
|-id=103 bgcolor=#E9E9E9
| 613103 ||  || — || October 7, 2005 || Kitt Peak || Spacewatch ||  || align=right | 1.0 km || 
|-id=104 bgcolor=#fefefe
| 613104 ||  || — || October 7, 2005 || Kitt Peak || Spacewatch || V || align=right data-sort-value="0.48" | 480 m || 
|-id=105 bgcolor=#E9E9E9
| 613105 ||  || — || October 7, 2005 || Kitt Peak || Spacewatch ||  || align=right | 1.0 km || 
|-id=106 bgcolor=#d6d6d6
| 613106 ||  || — || October 7, 2005 || Kitt Peak || Spacewatch ||  || align=right | 1.9 km || 
|-id=107 bgcolor=#d6d6d6
| 613107 ||  || — || October 7, 2005 || Kitt Peak || Spacewatch ||  || align=right | 1.9 km || 
|-id=108 bgcolor=#d6d6d6
| 613108 ||  || — || October 7, 2005 || Kitt Peak || Spacewatch ||  || align=right | 1.9 km || 
|-id=109 bgcolor=#E9E9E9
| 613109 ||  || — || October 7, 2005 || Kitt Peak || Spacewatch ||  || align=right | 1.0 km || 
|-id=110 bgcolor=#fefefe
| 613110 ||  || — || October 7, 2005 || Kitt Peak || Spacewatch ||  || align=right data-sort-value="0.54" | 540 m || 
|-id=111 bgcolor=#fefefe
| 613111 ||  || — || October 7, 2005 || Kitt Peak || Spacewatch ||  || align=right data-sort-value="0.66" | 660 m || 
|-id=112 bgcolor=#fefefe
| 613112 ||  || — || October 7, 2005 || Catalina || CSS ||  || align=right data-sort-value="0.64" | 640 m || 
|-id=113 bgcolor=#E9E9E9
| 613113 ||  || — || October 8, 2005 || Kitt Peak || Spacewatch ||  || align=right data-sort-value="0.99" | 990 m || 
|-id=114 bgcolor=#E9E9E9
| 613114 ||  || — || October 9, 2005 || Kitt Peak || Spacewatch ||  || align=right data-sort-value="0.69" | 690 m || 
|-id=115 bgcolor=#d6d6d6
| 613115 ||  || — || October 13, 2005 || Socorro || LINEAR || Tj (2.91) || align=right | 3.2 km || 
|-id=116 bgcolor=#E9E9E9
| 613116 ||  || — || October 11, 2005 || Apache Point || A. C. Becker ||  || align=right | 1.0 km || 
|-id=117 bgcolor=#E9E9E9
| 613117 ||  || — || October 9, 2005 || Kitt Peak || Spacewatch ||  || align=right data-sort-value="0.67" | 670 m || 
|-id=118 bgcolor=#E9E9E9
| 613118 ||  || — || October 22, 2005 || Junk Bond || D. Healy ||  || align=right | 1.5 km || 
|-id=119 bgcolor=#E9E9E9
| 613119 ||  || — || October 22, 2005 || Great Shefford || P. Birtwhistle ||  || align=right | 1.8 km || 
|-id=120 bgcolor=#E9E9E9
| 613120 ||  || — || October 24, 2005 || Kitt Peak || Spacewatch ||  || align=right data-sort-value="0.65" | 650 m || 
|-id=121 bgcolor=#fefefe
| 613121 ||  || — || October 24, 2005 || Kitt Peak || Spacewatch || MAS || align=right data-sort-value="0.52" | 520 m || 
|-id=122 bgcolor=#E9E9E9
| 613122 ||  || — || October 22, 2005 || Kitt Peak || Spacewatch ||  || align=right | 1.3 km || 
|-id=123 bgcolor=#E9E9E9
| 613123 ||  || — || October 22, 2005 || Kitt Peak || Spacewatch || DOR || align=right | 1.5 km || 
|-id=124 bgcolor=#FA8072
| 613124 ||  || — || October 22, 2005 || Catalina || CSS ||  || align=right data-sort-value="0.53" | 530 m || 
|-id=125 bgcolor=#fefefe
| 613125 ||  || — || October 22, 2005 || Kitt Peak || Spacewatch || NYS || align=right data-sort-value="0.74" | 740 m || 
|-id=126 bgcolor=#E9E9E9
| 613126 ||  || — || October 23, 2005 || Catalina || CSS ||  || align=right | 1.2 km || 
|-id=127 bgcolor=#d6d6d6
| 613127 ||  || — || October 23, 2005 || Palomar || NEAT ||  || align=right | 2.8 km || 
|-id=128 bgcolor=#d6d6d6
| 613128 ||  || — || October 22, 2005 || Kitt Peak || Spacewatch ||  || align=right | 2.3 km || 
|-id=129 bgcolor=#E9E9E9
| 613129 ||  || — || October 22, 2005 || Kitt Peak || Spacewatch ||  || align=right | 1.2 km || 
|-id=130 bgcolor=#E9E9E9
| 613130 ||  || — || October 22, 2005 || Kitt Peak || Spacewatch ||  || align=right | 1.6 km || 
|-id=131 bgcolor=#fefefe
| 613131 ||  || — || October 22, 2005 || Kitt Peak || Spacewatch ||  || align=right data-sort-value="0.80" | 800 m || 
|-id=132 bgcolor=#d6d6d6
| 613132 ||  || — || October 22, 2005 || Kitt Peak || Spacewatch || EUP || align=right | 3.0 km || 
|-id=133 bgcolor=#d6d6d6
| 613133 ||  || — || October 22, 2005 || Kitt Peak || Spacewatch || TIR || align=right | 2.4 km || 
|-id=134 bgcolor=#fefefe
| 613134 ||  || — || October 24, 2005 || Kitt Peak || Spacewatch ||  || align=right data-sort-value="0.62" | 620 m || 
|-id=135 bgcolor=#E9E9E9
| 613135 ||  || — || October 24, 2005 || Kitt Peak || Spacewatch ||  || align=right | 1.6 km || 
|-id=136 bgcolor=#E9E9E9
| 613136 ||  || — || October 25, 2005 || Kitt Peak || Spacewatch ||  || align=right | 1.7 km || 
|-id=137 bgcolor=#d6d6d6
| 613137 ||  || — || October 25, 2005 || Mount Lemmon || Mount Lemmon Survey ||  || align=right | 1.8 km || 
|-id=138 bgcolor=#d6d6d6
| 613138 ||  || — || October 25, 2005 || Mount Lemmon || Mount Lemmon Survey ||  || align=right | 1.3 km || 
|-id=139 bgcolor=#fefefe
| 613139 ||  || — || October 25, 2005 || Mount Lemmon || Mount Lemmon Survey || MAS || align=right data-sort-value="0.53" | 530 m || 
|-id=140 bgcolor=#d6d6d6
| 613140 ||  || — || October 26, 2005 || Kitt Peak || Spacewatch ||  || align=right | 2.1 km || 
|-id=141 bgcolor=#FA8072
| 613141 ||  || — || October 26, 2005 || Palomar || NEAT ||  || align=right data-sort-value="0.88" | 880 m || 
|-id=142 bgcolor=#fefefe
| 613142 ||  || — || October 25, 2005 || Mount Lemmon || Mount Lemmon Survey ||  || align=right | 1.5 km || 
|-id=143 bgcolor=#fefefe
| 613143 ||  || — || October 24, 2005 || Kitt Peak || Spacewatch || MAS || align=right data-sort-value="0.54" | 540 m || 
|-id=144 bgcolor=#fefefe
| 613144 ||  || — || October 24, 2005 || Kitt Peak || Spacewatch ||  || align=right data-sort-value="0.58" | 580 m || 
|-id=145 bgcolor=#E9E9E9
| 613145 ||  || — || October 24, 2005 || Kitt Peak || Spacewatch ||  || align=right | 1.4 km || 
|-id=146 bgcolor=#E9E9E9
| 613146 ||  || — || October 24, 2005 || Kitt Peak || Spacewatch || ADE || align=right | 1.4 km || 
|-id=147 bgcolor=#E9E9E9
| 613147 ||  || — || October 24, 2005 || Kitt Peak || Spacewatch ||  || align=right data-sort-value="0.73" | 730 m || 
|-id=148 bgcolor=#FA8072
| 613148 ||  || — || October 25, 2005 || Mount Lemmon || Mount Lemmon Survey ||  || align=right | 2.0 km || 
|-id=149 bgcolor=#E9E9E9
| 613149 ||  || — || October 25, 2005 || Mount Lemmon || Mount Lemmon Survey ||  || align=right data-sort-value="0.75" | 750 m || 
|-id=150 bgcolor=#E9E9E9
| 613150 ||  || — || October 25, 2005 || Mount Lemmon || Mount Lemmon Survey ||  || align=right data-sort-value="0.74" | 740 m || 
|-id=151 bgcolor=#d6d6d6
| 613151 ||  || — || October 26, 2005 || Kitt Peak || Spacewatch ||  || align=right | 2.3 km || 
|-id=152 bgcolor=#E9E9E9
| 613152 ||  || — || October 27, 2005 || Mount Lemmon || Mount Lemmon Survey || GEF || align=right | 1.6 km || 
|-id=153 bgcolor=#fefefe
| 613153 ||  || — || October 27, 2005 || Mount Lemmon || Mount Lemmon Survey ||  || align=right data-sort-value="0.62" | 620 m || 
|-id=154 bgcolor=#fefefe
| 613154 ||  || — || October 22, 2005 || Kitt Peak || Spacewatch || MAS || align=right data-sort-value="0.53" | 530 m || 
|-id=155 bgcolor=#fefefe
| 613155 ||  || — || October 22, 2005 || Kitt Peak || Spacewatch ||  || align=right data-sort-value="0.50" | 500 m || 
|-id=156 bgcolor=#fefefe
| 613156 ||  || — || October 25, 2005 || Kitt Peak || Spacewatch ||  || align=right data-sort-value="0.49" | 490 m || 
|-id=157 bgcolor=#d6d6d6
| 613157 ||  || — || October 25, 2005 || Kitt Peak || Spacewatch || LUT || align=right | 2.4 km || 
|-id=158 bgcolor=#fefefe
| 613158 ||  || — || October 25, 2005 || Kitt Peak || Spacewatch ||  || align=right data-sort-value="0.75" | 750 m || 
|-id=159 bgcolor=#fefefe
| 613159 ||  || — || October 27, 2005 || Kitt Peak || Spacewatch ||  || align=right data-sort-value="0.63" | 630 m || 
|-id=160 bgcolor=#fefefe
| 613160 ||  || — || October 27, 2005 || Kitt Peak || Spacewatch || NYS || align=right data-sort-value="0.52" | 520 m || 
|-id=161 bgcolor=#E9E9E9
| 613161 ||  || — || October 25, 2005 || Catalina || CSS ||  || align=right | 1.3 km || 
|-id=162 bgcolor=#fefefe
| 613162 ||  || — || October 22, 2005 || Kitt Peak || Spacewatch ||  || align=right data-sort-value="0.57" | 570 m || 
|-id=163 bgcolor=#d6d6d6
| 613163 ||  || — || October 25, 2005 || Kitt Peak || Spacewatch ||  || align=right | 2.1 km || 
|-id=164 bgcolor=#d6d6d6
| 613164 ||  || — || October 25, 2005 || Kitt Peak || Spacewatch ||  || align=right | 1.8 km || 
|-id=165 bgcolor=#E9E9E9
| 613165 ||  || — || October 25, 2005 || Kitt Peak || Spacewatch ||  || align=right | 1.7 km || 
|-id=166 bgcolor=#E9E9E9
| 613166 ||  || — || October 25, 2005 || Kitt Peak || Spacewatch ||  || align=right | 2.0 km || 
|-id=167 bgcolor=#E9E9E9
| 613167 ||  || — || October 25, 2005 || Mount Lemmon || Mount Lemmon Survey ||  || align=right data-sort-value="0.89" | 890 m || 
|-id=168 bgcolor=#fefefe
| 613168 ||  || — || October 25, 2005 || Kitt Peak || Spacewatch ||  || align=right data-sort-value="0.57" | 570 m || 
|-id=169 bgcolor=#E9E9E9
| 613169 ||  || — || October 25, 2005 || Kitt Peak || Spacewatch || BAR || align=right | 1.7 km || 
|-id=170 bgcolor=#E9E9E9
| 613170 ||  || — || October 26, 2005 || Kitt Peak || Spacewatch ||  || align=right data-sort-value="0.67" | 670 m || 
|-id=171 bgcolor=#fefefe
| 613171 ||  || — || October 24, 2005 || Kitt Peak || Spacewatch ||  || align=right data-sort-value="0.87" | 870 m || 
|-id=172 bgcolor=#fefefe
| 613172 ||  || — || October 27, 2005 || Kitt Peak || Spacewatch ||  || align=right data-sort-value="0.54" | 540 m || 
|-id=173 bgcolor=#d6d6d6
| 613173 ||  || — || October 27, 2005 || Kitt Peak || Spacewatch ||  || align=right | 1.9 km || 
|-id=174 bgcolor=#d6d6d6
| 613174 ||  || — || October 26, 2005 || Anderson Mesa || LONEOS ||  || align=right | 2.1 km || 
|-id=175 bgcolor=#d6d6d6
| 613175 ||  || — || October 25, 2005 || Mount Lemmon || Mount Lemmon Survey ||  || align=right | 2.1 km || 
|-id=176 bgcolor=#fefefe
| 613176 ||  || — || October 26, 2005 || Kitt Peak || Spacewatch || MAS || align=right data-sort-value="0.57" | 570 m || 
|-id=177 bgcolor=#d6d6d6
| 613177 ||  || — || October 26, 2005 || Kitt Peak || Spacewatch ||  || align=right | 3.4 km || 
|-id=178 bgcolor=#d6d6d6
| 613178 ||  || — || October 26, 2005 || Kitt Peak || Spacewatch ||  || align=right | 1.9 km || 
|-id=179 bgcolor=#fefefe
| 613179 ||  || — || October 26, 2005 || Kitt Peak || Spacewatch || MAS || align=right data-sort-value="0.54" | 540 m || 
|-id=180 bgcolor=#fefefe
| 613180 ||  || — || October 26, 2005 || Kitt Peak || Spacewatch ||  || align=right data-sort-value="0.46" | 460 m || 
|-id=181 bgcolor=#d6d6d6
| 613181 ||  || — || October 27, 2005 || Mount Lemmon || Mount Lemmon Survey || LIX || align=right | 2.7 km || 
|-id=182 bgcolor=#fefefe
| 613182 ||  || — || October 28, 2005 || Kitt Peak || Spacewatch ||  || align=right data-sort-value="0.50" | 500 m || 
|-id=183 bgcolor=#d6d6d6
| 613183 ||  || — || October 29, 2005 || Kitt Peak || Spacewatch ||  || align=right | 1.9 km || 
|-id=184 bgcolor=#d6d6d6
| 613184 ||  || — || October 30, 2005 || Kitt Peak || Spacewatch || LIX || align=right | 1.7 km || 
|-id=185 bgcolor=#E9E9E9
| 613185 ||  || — || October 31, 2005 || Kitt Peak || Spacewatch ||  || align=right | 1.1 km || 
|-id=186 bgcolor=#E9E9E9
| 613186 ||  || — || October 30, 2005 || Kitt Peak || Spacewatch ||  || align=right data-sort-value="0.61" | 610 m || 
|-id=187 bgcolor=#E9E9E9
| 613187 ||  || — || October 24, 2005 || Kitt Peak || Spacewatch ||  || align=right | 1.7 km || 
|-id=188 bgcolor=#E9E9E9
| 613188 ||  || — || October 25, 2005 || Kitt Peak || Spacewatch || EUN || align=right data-sort-value="0.88" | 880 m || 
|-id=189 bgcolor=#fefefe
| 613189 ||  || — || October 25, 2005 || Kitt Peak || Spacewatch || NYS || align=right data-sort-value="0.70" | 700 m || 
|-id=190 bgcolor=#fefefe
| 613190 ||  || — || October 27, 2005 || Kitt Peak || Spacewatch ||  || align=right data-sort-value="0.74" | 740 m || 
|-id=191 bgcolor=#E9E9E9
| 613191 ||  || — || October 27, 2005 || Mount Lemmon || Mount Lemmon Survey ||  || align=right | 1.4 km || 
|-id=192 bgcolor=#E9E9E9
| 613192 ||  || — || October 29, 2005 || Mount Lemmon || Mount Lemmon Survey ||  || align=right data-sort-value="0.60" | 600 m || 
|-id=193 bgcolor=#FA8072
| 613193 ||  || — || October 25, 2005 || Mount Lemmon || Mount Lemmon Survey ||  || align=right | 1.4 km || 
|-id=194 bgcolor=#fefefe
| 613194 ||  || — || October 25, 2005 || Mount Lemmon || Mount Lemmon Survey || H || align=right data-sort-value="0.55" | 550 m || 
|-id=195 bgcolor=#E9E9E9
| 613195 ||  || — || October 29, 2005 || Mount Lemmon || Mount Lemmon Survey ||  || align=right data-sort-value="0.50" | 500 m || 
|-id=196 bgcolor=#d6d6d6
| 613196 ||  || — || October 31, 2005 || Kitt Peak || Spacewatch ||  || align=right | 2.0 km || 
|-id=197 bgcolor=#d6d6d6
| 613197 ||  || — || October 31, 2005 || Mount Lemmon || Mount Lemmon Survey ||  || align=right | 3.7 km || 
|-id=198 bgcolor=#E9E9E9
| 613198 ||  || — || October 25, 2005 || Kitt Peak || Spacewatch ||  || align=right data-sort-value="0.75" | 750 m || 
|-id=199 bgcolor=#fefefe
| 613199 ||  || — || October 25, 2005 || Kitt Peak || Spacewatch || MAS || align=right data-sort-value="0.53" | 530 m || 
|-id=200 bgcolor=#E9E9E9
| 613200 ||  || — || October 25, 2005 || Kitt Peak || Spacewatch ||  || align=right | 1.0 km || 
|}

613201–613300 

|-bgcolor=#fefefe
| 613201 ||  || — || October 25, 2005 || Kitt Peak || Spacewatch ||  || align=right data-sort-value="0.71" | 710 m || 
|-id=202 bgcolor=#d6d6d6
| 613202 ||  || — || October 25, 2005 || Kitt Peak || Spacewatch || KOR || align=right | 1.6 km || 
|-id=203 bgcolor=#d6d6d6
| 613203 ||  || — || October 30, 2005 || Kitt Peak || Spacewatch ||  || align=right | 2.7 km || 
|-id=204 bgcolor=#d6d6d6
| 613204 ||  || — || October 30, 2005 || Kitt Peak || Spacewatch ||  || align=right | 2.1 km || 
|-id=205 bgcolor=#fefefe
| 613205 ||  || — || October 30, 2005 || Kitt Peak || Spacewatch || NYS || align=right data-sort-value="0.61" | 610 m || 
|-id=206 bgcolor=#d6d6d6
| 613206 ||  || — || October 22, 2005 || Kitt Peak || Spacewatch ||  || align=right | 2.1 km || 
|-id=207 bgcolor=#E9E9E9
| 613207 ||  || — || October 22, 2005 || Palomar || NEAT ||  || align=right data-sort-value="0.97" | 970 m || 
|-id=208 bgcolor=#d6d6d6
| 613208 ||  || — || October 23, 2005 || Catalina || CSS ||  || align=right | 2.9 km || 
|-id=209 bgcolor=#fefefe
| 613209 ||  || — || October 23, 2005 || Catalina || CSS ||  || align=right data-sort-value="0.76" | 760 m || 
|-id=210 bgcolor=#E9E9E9
| 613210 ||  || — || October 22, 2005 || Kitt Peak || Spacewatch ||  || align=right | 1.4 km || 
|-id=211 bgcolor=#d6d6d6
| 613211 ||  || — || October 25, 2005 || Apache Point || A. C. Becker || TEL || align=right | 1.9 km || 
|-id=212 bgcolor=#d6d6d6
| 613212 ||  || — || October 26, 2005 || Apache Point || A. C. Becker || EOS || align=right | 1.8 km || 
|-id=213 bgcolor=#d6d6d6
| 613213 ||  || — || October 26, 2005 || Apache Point || A. C. Becker ||  || align=right | 1.0 km || 
|-id=214 bgcolor=#C7FF8F
| 613214 ||  || — || October 25, 2005 || Mauna Kea || P. A. Wiegert || centaurcritical || align=right | 80 km || 
|-id=215 bgcolor=#fefefe
| 613215 ||  || — || October 24, 2005 || Kitt Peak || Spacewatch ||  || align=right data-sort-value="0.50" | 500 m || 
|-id=216 bgcolor=#d6d6d6
| 613216 ||  || — || October 25, 2005 || Mount Lemmon || Mount Lemmon Survey ||  || align=right | 1.7 km || 
|-id=217 bgcolor=#FFC2E0
| 613217 ||  || — || November 6, 2005 || Catalina || CSS || AMO +1km || align=right | 1.0 km || 
|-id=218 bgcolor=#fefefe
| 613218 ||  || — || November 1, 2005 || Kitt Peak || Spacewatch ||  || align=right data-sort-value="0.59" | 590 m || 
|-id=219 bgcolor=#E9E9E9
| 613219 ||  || — || November 2, 2005 || Socorro || LINEAR ||  || align=right | 1.4 km || 
|-id=220 bgcolor=#fefefe
| 613220 ||  || — || November 4, 2005 || Mount Lemmon || Mount Lemmon Survey || MAS || align=right data-sort-value="0.55" | 550 m || 
|-id=221 bgcolor=#fefefe
| 613221 ||  || — || November 2, 2005 || Mount Lemmon || Mount Lemmon Survey ||  || align=right data-sort-value="0.64" | 640 m || 
|-id=222 bgcolor=#E9E9E9
| 613222 ||  || — || November 4, 2005 || Mount Lemmon || Mount Lemmon Survey ||  || align=right | 1.2 km || 
|-id=223 bgcolor=#E9E9E9
| 613223 ||  || — || November 3, 2005 || Mount Lemmon || Mount Lemmon Survey ||  || align=right | 1.1 km || 
|-id=224 bgcolor=#d6d6d6
| 613224 ||  || — || November 5, 2005 || Mount Lemmon || Mount Lemmon Survey ||  || align=right | 1.8 km || 
|-id=225 bgcolor=#d6d6d6
| 613225 ||  || — || November 3, 2005 || Mount Lemmon || Mount Lemmon Survey ||  || align=right | 1.4 km || 
|-id=226 bgcolor=#d6d6d6
| 613226 ||  || — || November 4, 2005 || Kitt Peak || Spacewatch ||  || align=right | 2.4 km || 
|-id=227 bgcolor=#d6d6d6
| 613227 ||  || — || November 1, 2005 || Mount Lemmon || Mount Lemmon Survey ||  || align=right | 2.2 km || 
|-id=228 bgcolor=#fefefe
| 613228 ||  || — || November 1, 2005 || Mount Lemmon || Mount Lemmon Survey ||  || align=right data-sort-value="0.49" | 490 m || 
|-id=229 bgcolor=#E9E9E9
| 613229 ||  || — || November 4, 2005 || Kitt Peak || Spacewatch ||  || align=right data-sort-value="0.75" | 750 m || 
|-id=230 bgcolor=#E9E9E9
| 613230 ||  || — || November 1, 2005 || Kitt Peak || Spacewatch ||  || align=right | 1.3 km || 
|-id=231 bgcolor=#fefefe
| 613231 ||  || — || November 2, 2005 || Mount Lemmon || Mount Lemmon Survey ||  || align=right data-sort-value="0.61" | 610 m || 
|-id=232 bgcolor=#d6d6d6
| 613232 ||  || — || November 1, 2005 || Kitt Peak || Spacewatch ||  || align=right | 1.6 km || 
|-id=233 bgcolor=#E9E9E9
| 613233 ||  || — || November 6, 2005 || Kitt Peak || Spacewatch ||  || align=right data-sort-value="0.87" | 870 m || 
|-id=234 bgcolor=#FFC2E0
| 613234 ||  || — || November 1, 2005 || Mauna Kea || D. J. Tholen || APO || align=right data-sort-value="0.58" | 580 m || 
|-id=235 bgcolor=#E9E9E9
| 613235 ||  || — || November 1, 2005 || Apache Point || A. C. Becker ||  || align=right | 1.5 km || 
|-id=236 bgcolor=#d6d6d6
| 613236 ||  || — || November 1, 2005 || Apache Point || A. C. Becker ||  || align=right | 1.9 km || 
|-id=237 bgcolor=#d6d6d6
| 613237 ||  || — || November 6, 2005 || Kitt Peak || Spacewatch ||  || align=right | 2.2 km || 
|-id=238 bgcolor=#FA8072
| 613238 ||  || — || November 25, 2005 || Mount Lemmon || Mount Lemmon Survey ||  || align=right data-sort-value="0.48" | 480 m || 
|-id=239 bgcolor=#E9E9E9
| 613239 ||  || — || November 21, 2005 || Kitt Peak || Spacewatch ||  || align=right data-sort-value="0.60" | 600 m || 
|-id=240 bgcolor=#fefefe
| 613240 ||  || — || November 24, 2005 || Palomar || NEAT ||  || align=right | 1.9 km || 
|-id=241 bgcolor=#fefefe
| 613241 ||  || — || November 21, 2005 || Kitt Peak || Spacewatch || NYS || align=right data-sort-value="0.57" | 570 m || 
|-id=242 bgcolor=#d6d6d6
| 613242 ||  || — || November 21, 2005 || Kitt Peak || Spacewatch ||  || align=right | 2.1 km || 
|-id=243 bgcolor=#E9E9E9
| 613243 ||  || — || November 22, 2005 || Kitt Peak || Spacewatch ||  || align=right data-sort-value="0.61" | 610 m || 
|-id=244 bgcolor=#fefefe
| 613244 ||  || — || November 25, 2005 || Kitt Peak || Spacewatch ||  || align=right data-sort-value="0.57" | 570 m || 
|-id=245 bgcolor=#d6d6d6
| 613245 ||  || — || November 22, 2005 || Kitt Peak || Spacewatch ||  || align=right | 1.7 km || 
|-id=246 bgcolor=#d6d6d6
| 613246 ||  || — || November 21, 2005 || Palomar || NEAT || TIR || align=right | 2.9 km || 
|-id=247 bgcolor=#d6d6d6
| 613247 ||  || — || November 25, 2005 || Kitt Peak || Spacewatch || Tj (2.97) || align=right | 3.0 km || 
|-id=248 bgcolor=#fefefe
| 613248 ||  || — || November 26, 2005 || Kitt Peak || Spacewatch || MAS || align=right data-sort-value="0.63" | 630 m || 
|-id=249 bgcolor=#fefefe
| 613249 ||  || — || November 29, 2005 || Mount Lemmon || Mount Lemmon Survey ||  || align=right data-sort-value="0.50" | 500 m || 
|-id=250 bgcolor=#d6d6d6
| 613250 ||  || — || November 30, 2005 || Kitt Peak || Spacewatch ||  || align=right | 1.5 km || 
|-id=251 bgcolor=#d6d6d6
| 613251 ||  || — || November 25, 2005 || Mount Lemmon || Mount Lemmon Survey ||  || align=right | 1.9 km || 
|-id=252 bgcolor=#d6d6d6
| 613252 ||  || — || November 25, 2005 || Mount Lemmon || Mount Lemmon Survey ||  || align=right | 3.2 km || 
|-id=253 bgcolor=#fefefe
| 613253 ||  || — || November 25, 2005 || Mount Lemmon || Mount Lemmon Survey || MAS || align=right data-sort-value="0.58" | 580 m || 
|-id=254 bgcolor=#E9E9E9
| 613254 ||  || — || November 26, 2005 || Mount Lemmon || Mount Lemmon Survey ||  || align=right data-sort-value="0.53" | 530 m || 
|-id=255 bgcolor=#fefefe
| 613255 ||  || — || November 29, 2005 || Kitt Peak || Spacewatch || MAS || align=right data-sort-value="0.56" | 560 m || 
|-id=256 bgcolor=#d6d6d6
| 613256 ||  || — || November 25, 2005 || Kitt Peak || Spacewatch ||  || align=right | 2.3 km || 
|-id=257 bgcolor=#fefefe
| 613257 ||  || — || November 26, 2005 || Mount Lemmon || Mount Lemmon Survey || MAS || align=right data-sort-value="0.75" | 750 m || 
|-id=258 bgcolor=#d6d6d6
| 613258 ||  || — || November 29, 2005 || Kitt Peak || Spacewatch ||  || align=right | 2.9 km || 
|-id=259 bgcolor=#fefefe
| 613259 ||  || — || November 29, 2005 || Palomar || NEAT || H || align=right data-sort-value="0.80" | 800 m || 
|-id=260 bgcolor=#E9E9E9
| 613260 ||  || — || November 28, 2005 || Catalina || CSS ||  || align=right data-sort-value="0.83" | 830 m || 
|-id=261 bgcolor=#d6d6d6
| 613261 ||  || — || November 29, 2005 || Kitt Peak || Spacewatch || Tj (2.92) || align=right | 3.6 km || 
|-id=262 bgcolor=#d6d6d6
| 613262 ||  || — || December 2, 2005 || Kitt Peak || Spacewatch || KOR || align=right | 1.9 km || 
|-id=263 bgcolor=#fefefe
| 613263 ||  || — || December 4, 2005 || Kitt Peak || Spacewatch || NYS || align=right data-sort-value="0.47" | 470 m || 
|-id=264 bgcolor=#E9E9E9
| 613264 ||  || — || December 2, 2005 || Mount Lemmon || Mount Lemmon Survey ||  || align=right data-sort-value="0.51" | 510 m || 
|-id=265 bgcolor=#d6d6d6
| 613265 ||  || — || December 2, 2005 || Kitt Peak || Spacewatch || (1298) || align=right | 2.2 km || 
|-id=266 bgcolor=#E9E9E9
| 613266 ||  || — || December 2, 2005 || Kitt Peak || Spacewatch ||  || align=right | 1.6 km || 
|-id=267 bgcolor=#d6d6d6
| 613267 ||  || — || December 8, 2005 || Socorro || LINEAR ||  || align=right | 1.8 km || 
|-id=268 bgcolor=#fefefe
| 613268 ||  || — || December 6, 2005 || Kitt Peak || Spacewatch ||  || align=right data-sort-value="0.60" | 600 m || 
|-id=269 bgcolor=#d6d6d6
| 613269 ||  || — || December 1, 2005 || Kitt Peak || M. W. Buie ||  || align=right | 2.3 km || 
|-id=270 bgcolor=#fefefe
| 613270 ||  || — || December 1, 2005 || Kitt Peak || M. W. Buie ||  || align=right data-sort-value="0.35" | 350 m || 
|-id=271 bgcolor=#E9E9E9
| 613271 ||  || — || December 21, 2005 || Kitt Peak || Spacewatch ||  || align=right data-sort-value="0.50" | 500 m || 
|-id=272 bgcolor=#fefefe
| 613272 ||  || — || December 22, 2005 || Kitt Peak || Spacewatch ||  || align=right data-sort-value="0.50" | 500 m || 
|-id=273 bgcolor=#fefefe
| 613273 ||  || — || December 21, 2005 || Kitt Peak || Spacewatch || NYS || align=right data-sort-value="0.62" | 620 m || 
|-id=274 bgcolor=#E9E9E9
| 613274 ||  || — || December 22, 2005 || Kitt Peak || Spacewatch ||  || align=right data-sort-value="0.68" | 680 m || 
|-id=275 bgcolor=#fefefe
| 613275 ||  || — || December 25, 2005 || Kitt Peak || Spacewatch ||  || align=right data-sort-value="0.50" | 500 m || 
|-id=276 bgcolor=#FA8072
| 613276 ||  || — || December 24, 2005 || Catalina || CSS ||  || align=right data-sort-value="0.89" | 890 m || 
|-id=277 bgcolor=#E9E9E9
| 613277 ||  || — || December 24, 2005 || Kitt Peak || Spacewatch ||  || align=right | 1.4 km || 
|-id=278 bgcolor=#E9E9E9
| 613278 ||  || — || December 22, 2005 || Kitt Peak || Spacewatch ||  || align=right | 1.8 km || 
|-id=279 bgcolor=#fefefe
| 613279 ||  || — || December 24, 2005 || La Canada || J. Lacruz || H || align=right data-sort-value="0.59" | 590 m || 
|-id=280 bgcolor=#E9E9E9
| 613280 ||  || — || December 25, 2005 || Mount Lemmon || Mount Lemmon Survey ||  || align=right data-sort-value="0.54" | 540 m || 
|-id=281 bgcolor=#d6d6d6
| 613281 ||  || — || December 26, 2005 || Kitt Peak || Spacewatch ||  || align=right | 3.3 km || 
|-id=282 bgcolor=#E9E9E9
| 613282 ||  || — || December 26, 2005 || Kitt Peak || Spacewatch ||  || align=right | 1.8 km || 
|-id=283 bgcolor=#fefefe
| 613283 ||  || — || December 24, 2005 || Kitt Peak || Spacewatch ||  || align=right data-sort-value="0.56" | 560 m || 
|-id=284 bgcolor=#fefefe
| 613284 ||  || — || December 25, 2005 || Mount Lemmon || Mount Lemmon Survey || MAS || align=right data-sort-value="0.58" | 580 m || 
|-id=285 bgcolor=#fefefe
| 613285 ||  || — || December 25, 2005 || Kitt Peak || Spacewatch || NYS || align=right data-sort-value="0.42" | 420 m || 
|-id=286 bgcolor=#FFC2E0
| 613286 ||  || — || December 30, 2005 || Catalina || CSS || ATEPHAmoon || align=right data-sort-value="0.27" | 270 m || 
|-id=287 bgcolor=#fefefe
| 613287 ||  || — || December 25, 2005 || Mount Lemmon || Mount Lemmon Survey ||  || align=right data-sort-value="0.70" | 700 m || 
|-id=288 bgcolor=#fefefe
| 613288 ||  || — || December 25, 2005 || Kitt Peak || Spacewatch ||  || align=right data-sort-value="0.46" | 460 m || 
|-id=289 bgcolor=#FA8072
| 613289 ||  || — || December 26, 2005 || Mount Lemmon || Mount Lemmon Survey || H || align=right data-sort-value="0.80" | 800 m || 
|-id=290 bgcolor=#fefefe
| 613290 ||  || — || December 26, 2005 || Kitt Peak || Spacewatch ||  || align=right data-sort-value="0.75" | 750 m || 
|-id=291 bgcolor=#FFC2E0
| 613291 ||  || — || December 30, 2005 || Socorro || LINEAR || APO || align=right data-sort-value="0.56" | 560 m || 
|-id=292 bgcolor=#fefefe
| 613292 ||  || — || December 25, 2005 || Mount Lemmon || Mount Lemmon Survey ||  || align=right | 1.5 km || 
|-id=293 bgcolor=#fefefe
| 613293 ||  || — || December 28, 2005 || Mount Lemmon || Mount Lemmon Survey ||  || align=right data-sort-value="0.95" | 950 m || 
|-id=294 bgcolor=#d6d6d6
| 613294 ||  || — || December 25, 2005 || Kitt Peak || Spacewatch ||  || align=right | 1.8 km || 
|-id=295 bgcolor=#d6d6d6
| 613295 ||  || — || December 25, 2005 || Kitt Peak || Spacewatch ||  || align=right | 1.8 km || 
|-id=296 bgcolor=#E9E9E9
| 613296 ||  || — || December 25, 2005 || Kitt Peak || Spacewatch ||  || align=right | 1.3 km || 
|-id=297 bgcolor=#d6d6d6
| 613297 ||  || — || December 27, 2005 || Kitt Peak || Spacewatch ||  || align=right | 2.0 km || 
|-id=298 bgcolor=#fefefe
| 613298 ||  || — || December 27, 2005 || Kitt Peak || Spacewatch ||  || align=right data-sort-value="0.70" | 700 m || 
|-id=299 bgcolor=#d6d6d6
| 613299 ||  || — || December 27, 2005 || Kitt Peak || Spacewatch ||  || align=right | 1.7 km || 
|-id=300 bgcolor=#d6d6d6
| 613300 ||  || — || December 22, 2005 || Socorro || LINEAR || Tj (2.97) || align=right | 2.9 km || 
|}

613301–613400 

|-bgcolor=#d6d6d6
| 613301 ||  || — || December 22, 2005 || Kitt Peak || Spacewatch ||  || align=right | 3.1 km || 
|-id=302 bgcolor=#E9E9E9
| 613302 ||  || — || December 22, 2005 || Kitt Peak || Spacewatch ||  || align=right data-sort-value="0.58" | 580 m || 
|-id=303 bgcolor=#fefefe
| 613303 ||  || — || December 25, 2005 || Kitt Peak || Spacewatch ||  || align=right data-sort-value="0.61" | 610 m || 
|-id=304 bgcolor=#fefefe
| 613304 ||  || — || December 30, 2005 || Mount Lemmon || Mount Lemmon Survey ||  || align=right data-sort-value="0.52" | 520 m || 
|-id=305 bgcolor=#fefefe
| 613305 ||  || — || December 26, 2005 || Mount Lemmon || Mount Lemmon Survey ||  || align=right data-sort-value="0.64" | 640 m || 
|-id=306 bgcolor=#d6d6d6
| 613306 ||  || — || December 28, 2005 || Mount Lemmon || Mount Lemmon Survey ||  || align=right | 2.7 km || 
|-id=307 bgcolor=#d6d6d6
| 613307 ||  || — || December 31, 2005 || Mount Lemmon || Mount Lemmon Survey || Tj (2.98) || align=right | 2.6 km || 
|-id=308 bgcolor=#E9E9E9
| 613308 ||  || — || December 30, 2005 || Kitt Peak || Spacewatch ||  || align=right | 1.7 km || 
|-id=309 bgcolor=#fefefe
| 613309 ||  || — || December 24, 2005 || Kitt Peak || Spacewatch || V || align=right data-sort-value="0.53" | 530 m || 
|-id=310 bgcolor=#fefefe
| 613310 ||  || — || December 25, 2005 || Kitt Peak || Spacewatch || MAS || align=right data-sort-value="0.63" | 630 m || 
|-id=311 bgcolor=#E9E9E9
| 613311 ||  || — || December 25, 2005 || Kitt Peak || Spacewatch ||  || align=right data-sort-value="0.75" | 750 m || 
|-id=312 bgcolor=#fefefe
| 613312 ||  || — || December 30, 2005 || Mount Lemmon || Mount Lemmon Survey ||  || align=right data-sort-value="0.63" | 630 m || 
|-id=313 bgcolor=#fefefe
| 613313 ||  || — || December 25, 2005 || Kitt Peak || Spacewatch ||  || align=right data-sort-value="0.61" | 610 m || 
|-id=314 bgcolor=#FA8072
| 613314 ||  || — || December 25, 2005 || Anderson Mesa || LONEOS ||  || align=right data-sort-value="0.45" | 450 m || 
|-id=315 bgcolor=#FFC2E0
| 613315 ||  || — || January 5, 2006 || Catalina || CSS || AMO || align=right data-sort-value="0.35" | 350 m || 
|-id=316 bgcolor=#E9E9E9
| 613316 ||  || — || January 5, 2006 || Mount Lemmon || Mount Lemmon Survey ||  || align=right data-sort-value="0.56" | 560 m || 
|-id=317 bgcolor=#fefefe
| 613317 ||  || — || January 5, 2006 || Mount Lemmon || Mount Lemmon Survey ||  || align=right data-sort-value="0.61" | 610 m || 
|-id=318 bgcolor=#fefefe
| 613318 ||  || — || January 5, 2006 || Kitt Peak || Spacewatch || MAS || align=right data-sort-value="0.58" | 580 m || 
|-id=319 bgcolor=#fefefe
| 613319 ||  || — || January 5, 2006 || Kitt Peak || Spacewatch ||  || align=right data-sort-value="0.70" | 700 m || 
|-id=320 bgcolor=#fefefe
| 613320 ||  || — || January 6, 2006 || Mount Lemmon || Mount Lemmon Survey ||  || align=right data-sort-value="0.48" | 480 m || 
|-id=321 bgcolor=#fefefe
| 613321 ||  || — || January 5, 2006 || Kitt Peak || Spacewatch || NYS || align=right data-sort-value="0.54" | 540 m || 
|-id=322 bgcolor=#E9E9E9
| 613322 ||  || — || January 6, 2006 || Kitt Peak || Spacewatch ||  || align=right data-sort-value="0.66" | 660 m || 
|-id=323 bgcolor=#fefefe
| 613323 ||  || — || January 7, 2006 || Anderson Mesa || LONEOS || PHO || align=right | 3.0 km || 
|-id=324 bgcolor=#fefefe
| 613324 ||  || — || January 7, 2006 || Mount Lemmon || Mount Lemmon Survey || NYS || align=right data-sort-value="0.62" | 620 m || 
|-id=325 bgcolor=#d6d6d6
| 613325 ||  || — || January 4, 2006 || Kitt Peak || Spacewatch || LIX || align=right | 2.1 km || 
|-id=326 bgcolor=#fefefe
| 613326 ||  || — || January 20, 2006 || Kitt Peak || Spacewatch || NYS || align=right data-sort-value="0.69" | 690 m || 
|-id=327 bgcolor=#fefefe
| 613327 ||  || — || January 22, 2006 || Mount Lemmon || Mount Lemmon Survey ||  || align=right | 2.2 km || 
|-id=328 bgcolor=#E9E9E9
| 613328 ||  || — || January 26, 2006 || Kitt Peak || Spacewatch ||  || align=right data-sort-value="0.60" | 600 m || 
|-id=329 bgcolor=#fefefe
| 613329 ||  || — || January 23, 2006 || Mount Lemmon || Mount Lemmon Survey ||  || align=right data-sort-value="0.64" | 640 m || 
|-id=330 bgcolor=#fefefe
| 613330 ||  || — || January 22, 2006 || Catalina || CSS || H || align=right data-sort-value="0.77" | 770 m || 
|-id=331 bgcolor=#fefefe
| 613331 ||  || — || January 23, 2006 || Kitt Peak || Spacewatch ||  || align=right data-sort-value="0.57" | 570 m || 
|-id=332 bgcolor=#E9E9E9
| 613332 ||  || — || January 23, 2006 || Kitt Peak || Spacewatch ||  || align=right data-sort-value="0.81" | 810 m || 
|-id=333 bgcolor=#fefefe
| 613333 ||  || — || January 23, 2006 || Kitt Peak || Spacewatch ||  || align=right data-sort-value="0.72" | 720 m || 
|-id=334 bgcolor=#E9E9E9
| 613334 ||  || — || January 23, 2006 || Mount Lemmon || Mount Lemmon Survey ||  || align=right data-sort-value="0.96" | 960 m || 
|-id=335 bgcolor=#fefefe
| 613335 ||  || — || January 23, 2006 || Mount Lemmon || Mount Lemmon Survey ||  || align=right data-sort-value="0.55" | 550 m || 
|-id=336 bgcolor=#fefefe
| 613336 ||  || — || January 23, 2006 || Mount Lemmon || Mount Lemmon Survey || NYS || align=right data-sort-value="0.56" | 560 m || 
|-id=337 bgcolor=#E9E9E9
| 613337 ||  || — || January 23, 2006 || Mount Lemmon || Mount Lemmon Survey ||  || align=right data-sort-value="0.67" | 670 m || 
|-id=338 bgcolor=#E9E9E9
| 613338 ||  || — || January 25, 2006 || Kitt Peak || Spacewatch ||  || align=right | 1.4 km || 
|-id=339 bgcolor=#fefefe
| 613339 ||  || — || January 26, 2006 || Kitt Peak || Spacewatch ||  || align=right data-sort-value="0.59" | 590 m || 
|-id=340 bgcolor=#fefefe
| 613340 ||  || — || January 26, 2006 || Kitt Peak || Spacewatch || MAS || align=right data-sort-value="0.55" | 550 m || 
|-id=341 bgcolor=#E9E9E9
| 613341 ||  || — || January 26, 2006 || Mount Lemmon || Mount Lemmon Survey ||  || align=right data-sort-value="0.60" | 600 m || 
|-id=342 bgcolor=#d6d6d6
| 613342 ||  || — || January 27, 2006 || Mount Lemmon || Mount Lemmon Survey || THM || align=right | 2.0 km || 
|-id=343 bgcolor=#fefefe
| 613343 ||  || — || January 25, 2006 || Kitt Peak || Spacewatch ||  || align=right data-sort-value="0.54" | 540 m || 
|-id=344 bgcolor=#d6d6d6
| 613344 ||  || — || January 27, 2006 || Kitt Peak || Spacewatch || VER || align=right | 2.3 km || 
|-id=345 bgcolor=#d6d6d6
| 613345 ||  || — || January 27, 2006 || Mount Lemmon || Mount Lemmon Survey ||  || align=right | 2.0 km || 
|-id=346 bgcolor=#fefefe
| 613346 ||  || — || January 30, 2006 || Kitt Peak || Spacewatch ||  || align=right data-sort-value="0.72" | 720 m || 
|-id=347 bgcolor=#E9E9E9
| 613347 ||  || — || January 30, 2006 || Kitt Peak || Spacewatch ||  || align=right data-sort-value="0.68" | 680 m || 
|-id=348 bgcolor=#fefefe
| 613348 ||  || — || January 31, 2006 || Kitt Peak || Spacewatch ||  || align=right data-sort-value="0.50" | 500 m || 
|-id=349 bgcolor=#C7FF8F
| 613349 ||  || — || January 31, 2006 || Catalina || CSS || unusual || align=right | 5.5 km || 
|-id=350 bgcolor=#fefefe
| 613350 ||  || — || January 31, 2006 || Kitt Peak || Spacewatch || NYS || align=right data-sort-value="0.71" | 710 m || 
|-id=351 bgcolor=#E9E9E9
| 613351 ||  || — || January 30, 2006 || Kitt Peak || Spacewatch ||  || align=right | 2.4 km || 
|-id=352 bgcolor=#fefefe
| 613352 ||  || — || January 31, 2006 || Kitt Peak || Spacewatch ||  || align=right data-sort-value="0.66" | 660 m || 
|-id=353 bgcolor=#fefefe
| 613353 ||  || — || January 31, 2006 || Kitt Peak || Spacewatch ||  || align=right data-sort-value="0.58" | 580 m || 
|-id=354 bgcolor=#E9E9E9
| 613354 ||  || — || January 31, 2006 || Kitt Peak || Spacewatch ||  || align=right data-sort-value="0.63" | 630 m || 
|-id=355 bgcolor=#fefefe
| 613355 ||  || — || January 31, 2006 || Kitt Peak || Spacewatch || NYS || align=right data-sort-value="0.70" | 700 m || 
|-id=356 bgcolor=#E9E9E9
| 613356 ||  || — || January 31, 2006 || Kitt Peak || Spacewatch ||  || align=right | 2.6 km || 
|-id=357 bgcolor=#fefefe
| 613357 ||  || — || January 31, 2006 || Kitt Peak || Spacewatch ||  || align=right data-sort-value="0.56" | 560 m || 
|-id=358 bgcolor=#fefefe
| 613358 ||  || — || January 31, 2006 || Kitt Peak || Spacewatch ||  || align=right data-sort-value="0.75" | 750 m || 
|-id=359 bgcolor=#E9E9E9
| 613359 ||  || — || January 31, 2006 || Kitt Peak || Spacewatch ||  || align=right data-sort-value="0.70" | 700 m || 
|-id=360 bgcolor=#fefefe
| 613360 ||  || — || January 22, 2006 || Mount Lemmon || Mount Lemmon Survey || NYS || align=right data-sort-value="0.71" | 710 m || 
|-id=361 bgcolor=#E9E9E9
| 613361 ||  || — || January 26, 2006 || Kitt Peak || Spacewatch || EUN || align=right data-sort-value="0.84" | 840 m || 
|-id=362 bgcolor=#E9E9E9
| 613362 ||  || — || January 26, 2006 || Kitt Peak || Spacewatch ||  || align=right | 1.9 km || 
|-id=363 bgcolor=#E9E9E9
| 613363 ||  || — || January 25, 2006 || Kitt Peak || Spacewatch ||  || align=right data-sort-value="0.58" | 580 m || 
|-id=364 bgcolor=#fefefe
| 613364 ||  || — || January 31, 2006 || Kitt Peak || Spacewatch || MAS || align=right data-sort-value="0.59" | 590 m || 
|-id=365 bgcolor=#fefefe
| 613365 ||  || — || February 1, 2006 || Mount Lemmon || Mount Lemmon Survey || (6769) || align=right data-sort-value="0.70" | 700 m || 
|-id=366 bgcolor=#d6d6d6
| 613366 ||  || — || February 2, 2006 || Kitt Peak || Spacewatch ||  || align=right | 3.0 km || 
|-id=367 bgcolor=#fefefe
| 613367 ||  || — || February 6, 2006 || Mount Lemmon || Mount Lemmon Survey ||  || align=right data-sort-value="0.69" | 690 m || 
|-id=368 bgcolor=#E9E9E9
| 613368 ||  || — || February 1, 2006 || Kitt Peak || Spacewatch ||  || align=right data-sort-value="0.73" | 730 m || 
|-id=369 bgcolor=#E9E9E9
| 613369 ||  || — || February 20, 2006 || Kitt Peak || Spacewatch ||  || align=right | 1.1 km || 
|-id=370 bgcolor=#fefefe
| 613370 ||  || — || February 20, 2006 || Kitt Peak || Spacewatch ||  || align=right data-sort-value="0.54" | 540 m || 
|-id=371 bgcolor=#fefefe
| 613371 ||  || — || February 20, 2006 || Kitt Peak || Spacewatch || NYS || align=right data-sort-value="0.64" | 640 m || 
|-id=372 bgcolor=#fefefe
| 613372 ||  || — || February 20, 2006 || Kitt Peak || Spacewatch ||  || align=right data-sort-value="0.50" | 500 m || 
|-id=373 bgcolor=#fefefe
| 613373 ||  || — || February 20, 2006 || Kitt Peak || Spacewatch || NYS || align=right data-sort-value="0.61" | 610 m || 
|-id=374 bgcolor=#fefefe
| 613374 ||  || — || February 24, 2006 || Kitt Peak || Spacewatch ||  || align=right data-sort-value="0.63" | 630 m || 
|-id=375 bgcolor=#d6d6d6
| 613375 ||  || — || February 24, 2006 || Mount Lemmon || Mount Lemmon Survey ||  || align=right | 1.6 km || 
|-id=376 bgcolor=#fefefe
| 613376 ||  || — || February 24, 2006 || Kitt Peak || Spacewatch ||  || align=right data-sort-value="0.57" | 570 m || 
|-id=377 bgcolor=#E9E9E9
| 613377 ||  || — || February 24, 2006 || Kitt Peak || Spacewatch ||  || align=right data-sort-value="0.71" | 710 m || 
|-id=378 bgcolor=#d6d6d6
| 613378 ||  || — || February 24, 2006 || Kitt Peak || Spacewatch || 7:4 || align=right | 2.3 km || 
|-id=379 bgcolor=#fefefe
| 613379 ||  || — || February 24, 2006 || Kitt Peak || Spacewatch || MAS || align=right data-sort-value="0.52" | 520 m || 
|-id=380 bgcolor=#E9E9E9
| 613380 ||  || — || February 25, 2006 || Mount Lemmon || Mount Lemmon Survey ||  || align=right | 1.1 km || 
|-id=381 bgcolor=#E9E9E9
| 613381 ||  || — || February 24, 2006 || Mount Lemmon || Mount Lemmon Survey ||  || align=right | 2.1 km || 
|-id=382 bgcolor=#fefefe
| 613382 ||  || — || February 25, 2006 || Kitt Peak || Spacewatch ||  || align=right data-sort-value="0.54" | 540 m || 
|-id=383 bgcolor=#fefefe
| 613383 ||  || — || February 27, 2006 || Kitt Peak || Spacewatch || NYScritical || align=right data-sort-value="0.72" | 720 m || 
|-id=384 bgcolor=#E9E9E9
| 613384 ||  || — || February 27, 2006 || Kitt Peak || Spacewatch ||  || align=right data-sort-value="0.70" | 700 m || 
|-id=385 bgcolor=#E9E9E9
| 613385 ||  || — || February 27, 2006 || Kitt Peak || Spacewatch ||  || align=right | 1.0 km || 
|-id=386 bgcolor=#fefefe
| 613386 ||  || — || February 27, 2006 || Mount Lemmon || Mount Lemmon Survey ||  || align=right data-sort-value="0.71" | 710 m || 
|-id=387 bgcolor=#E9E9E9
| 613387 ||  || — || February 27, 2006 || Kitt Peak || Spacewatch ||  || align=right data-sort-value="0.64" | 640 m || 
|-id=388 bgcolor=#E9E9E9
| 613388 ||  || — || February 28, 2006 || Mount Lemmon || Mount Lemmon Survey ||  || align=right data-sort-value="0.62" | 620 m || 
|-id=389 bgcolor=#fefefe
| 613389 ||  || — || February 25, 2006 || Kitt Peak || Spacewatch || NYS || align=right data-sort-value="0.71" | 710 m || 
|-id=390 bgcolor=#fefefe
| 613390 ||  || — || March 2, 2006 || Kitt Peak || Spacewatch ||  || align=right data-sort-value="0.61" | 610 m || 
|-id=391 bgcolor=#E9E9E9
| 613391 ||  || — || March 2, 2006 || Kitt Peak || Spacewatch ||  || align=right | 2.4 km || 
|-id=392 bgcolor=#E9E9E9
| 613392 ||  || — || March 2, 2006 || Kitt Peak || Spacewatch ||  || align=right | 1.2 km || 
|-id=393 bgcolor=#FA8072
| 613393 ||  || — || March 2, 2006 || Kitt Peak || Spacewatch ||  || align=right data-sort-value="0.58" | 580 m || 
|-id=394 bgcolor=#fefefe
| 613394 ||  || — || March 3, 2006 || Kitt Peak || Spacewatch || MAS || align=right data-sort-value="0.57" | 570 m || 
|-id=395 bgcolor=#E9E9E9
| 613395 ||  || — || March 3, 2006 || Kitt Peak || Spacewatch ||  || align=right | 1.5 km || 
|-id=396 bgcolor=#fefefe
| 613396 ||  || — || March 3, 2006 || Kitt Peak || Spacewatch ||  || align=right data-sort-value="0.50" | 500 m || 
|-id=397 bgcolor=#FFC2E0
| 613397 ||  || — || March 22, 2006 || Socorro || LINEAR || APO || align=right data-sort-value="0.31" | 310 m || 
|-id=398 bgcolor=#FFC2E0
| 613398 ||  || — || March 23, 2006 || Catalina || CSS || ATE || align=right data-sort-value="0.20" | 200 m || 
|-id=399 bgcolor=#fefefe
| 613399 ||  || — || March 23, 2006 || Kitt Peak || Spacewatch ||  || align=right data-sort-value="0.68" | 680 m || 
|-id=400 bgcolor=#FFC2E0
| 613400 ||  || — || March 31, 2006 || Siding Spring || SSS || ATE || align=right data-sort-value="0.088" | 88 m || 
|}

613401–613500 

|-bgcolor=#FFC2E0
| 613401 ||  || — || March 25, 2006 || Catalina || CSS || AMO || align=right data-sort-value="0.61" | 610 m || 
|-id=402 bgcolor=#E9E9E9
| 613402 ||  || — || March 23, 2006 || Kitt Peak || Spacewatch || NEM || align=right | 1.5 km || 
|-id=403 bgcolor=#FFC2E0
| 613403 ||  || — || April 2, 2006 || Socorro || LINEAR || ATEPHA || align=right data-sort-value="0.30" | 300 m || 
|-id=404 bgcolor=#d6d6d6
| 613404 ||  || — || April 2, 2006 || Kitt Peak || Spacewatch ||  || align=right | 2.2 km || 
|-id=405 bgcolor=#E9E9E9
| 613405 ||  || — || April 2, 2006 || Mount Lemmon || Mount Lemmon Survey ||  || align=right | 2.0 km || 
|-id=406 bgcolor=#E9E9E9
| 613406 ||  || — || April 20, 2006 || Kitt Peak || Spacewatch ||  || align=right data-sort-value="0.89" | 890 m || 
|-id=407 bgcolor=#E9E9E9
| 613407 ||  || — || April 21, 2006 || Kitt Peak || Spacewatch ||  || align=right | 1.0 km || 
|-id=408 bgcolor=#d6d6d6
| 613408 ||  || — || April 24, 2006 || Mount Lemmon || Mount Lemmon Survey ||  || align=right | 2.9 km || 
|-id=409 bgcolor=#E9E9E9
| 613409 ||  || — || April 25, 2006 || Kitt Peak || Spacewatch ||  || align=right | 1.1 km || 
|-id=410 bgcolor=#E9E9E9
| 613410 ||  || — || April 26, 2006 || Kitt Peak || Spacewatch ||  || align=right data-sort-value="0.78" | 780 m || 
|-id=411 bgcolor=#C2E0FF
| 613411 ||  || — || April 26, 2006 || Cerro Tololo || M. W. Buie || SDO || align=right | 217 km || 
|-id=412 bgcolor=#C2E0FF
| 613412 ||  || — || April 27, 2006 || Cerro Tololo || M. W. Buie || SDOcritical || align=right | 176 km || 
|-id=413 bgcolor=#d6d6d6
| 613413 ||  || — || April 28, 2006 || Cerro Tololo || M. W. Buie ||  || align=right | 2.1 km || 
|-id=414 bgcolor=#E9E9E9
| 613414 ||  || — || April 26, 2006 || Cerro Tololo || M. W. Buie ||  || align=right | 1.1 km || 
|-id=415 bgcolor=#fefefe
| 613415 ||  || — || April 26, 2006 || Kitt Peak || Spacewatch ||  || align=right data-sort-value="0.54" | 540 m || 
|-id=416 bgcolor=#fefefe
| 613416 ||  || — || May 1, 2006 || Kitt Peak || Spacewatch || NYS || align=right data-sort-value="0.70" | 700 m || 
|-id=417 bgcolor=#fefefe
| 613417 ||  || — || May 6, 2006 || Kitt Peak || Spacewatch || NYS || align=right data-sort-value="0.61" | 610 m || 
|-id=418 bgcolor=#fefefe
| 613418 ||  || — || May 1, 2006 || Kitt Peak || M. W. Buie ||  || align=right data-sort-value="0.51" | 510 m || 
|-id=419 bgcolor=#fefefe
| 613419 Lafayettequartet ||  ||  || May 1, 2006 || Mauna Kea || P. A. Wiegert ||  || align=right data-sort-value="0.54" | 540 m || 
|-id=420 bgcolor=#FFC2E0
| 613420 ||  || — || May 20, 2006 || Kitt Peak || Spacewatch || APO || align=right data-sort-value="0.30" | 300 m || 
|-id=421 bgcolor=#E9E9E9
| 613421 ||  || — || May 20, 2006 || Kitt Peak || Spacewatch ||  || align=right | 1.4 km || 
|-id=422 bgcolor=#FFC2E0
| 613422 ||  || — || May 23, 2006 || Kitt Peak || Spacewatch || AMO || align=right data-sort-value="0.65" | 650 m || 
|-id=423 bgcolor=#fefefe
| 613423 ||  || — || May 20, 2006 || Kitt Peak || Spacewatch ||  || align=right data-sort-value="0.58" | 580 m || 
|-id=424 bgcolor=#E9E9E9
| 613424 ||  || — || May 21, 2006 || Anderson Mesa || LONEOS ||  || align=right | 1.2 km || 
|-id=425 bgcolor=#E9E9E9
| 613425 ||  || — || May 21, 2006 || Kitt Peak || Spacewatch ||  || align=right data-sort-value="0.89" | 890 m || 
|-id=426 bgcolor=#E9E9E9
| 613426 ||  || — || May 21, 2006 || Kitt Peak || Spacewatch ||  || align=right | 1.1 km || 
|-id=427 bgcolor=#FA8072
| 613427 ||  || — || May 22, 2006 || Kitt Peak || Spacewatch ||  || align=right data-sort-value="0.37" | 370 m || 
|-id=428 bgcolor=#E9E9E9
| 613428 ||  || — || May 22, 2006 || Kitt Peak || Spacewatch ||  || align=right | 1.1 km || 
|-id=429 bgcolor=#E9E9E9
| 613429 ||  || — || May 23, 2006 || Mount Lemmon || Mount Lemmon Survey ||  || align=right | 1.1 km || 
|-id=430 bgcolor=#fefefe
| 613430 ||  || — || May 22, 2006 || Kitt Peak || Spacewatch ||  || align=right data-sort-value="0.58" | 580 m || 
|-id=431 bgcolor=#fefefe
| 613431 ||  || — || May 25, 2006 || Mount Lemmon || Mount Lemmon Survey ||  || align=right data-sort-value="0.80" | 800 m || 
|-id=432 bgcolor=#fefefe
| 613432 ||  || — || May 21, 2006 || Kitt Peak || Spacewatch || ERI || align=right data-sort-value="0.60" | 600 m || 
|-id=433 bgcolor=#FFC2E0
| 613433 ||  || — || May 27, 2006 || Mount Lemmon || Mount Lemmon Survey || APO +1km || align=right data-sort-value="0.83" | 830 m || 
|-id=434 bgcolor=#FFC2E0
| 613434 ||  || — || May 28, 2006 || Socorro || LINEAR || AMO || align=right data-sort-value="0.67" | 670 m || 
|-id=435 bgcolor=#fefefe
| 613435 ||  || — || May 26, 2006 || Mount Lemmon || Mount Lemmon Survey ||  || align=right data-sort-value="0.58" | 580 m || 
|-id=436 bgcolor=#E9E9E9
| 613436 ||  || — || May 25, 2006 || Mount Lemmon || Mount Lemmon Survey ||  || align=right | 1.3 km || 
|-id=437 bgcolor=#E9E9E9
| 613437 ||  || — || June 20, 2006 || Kitt Peak || Spacewatch ||  || align=right | 1.0 km || 
|-id=438 bgcolor=#FA8072
| 613438 ||  || — || July 18, 2006 || Eskridge || Farpoint Obs. ||  || align=right | 1.2 km || 
|-id=439 bgcolor=#FFC2E0
| 613439 ||  || — || July 18, 2006 || Siding Spring || SSS || AMO || align=right data-sort-value="0.65" | 650 m || 
|-id=440 bgcolor=#FFC2E0
| 613440 ||  || — || July 21, 2006 || Socorro || LINEAR || APO || align=right data-sort-value="0.41" | 410 m || 
|-id=441 bgcolor=#FA8072
| 613441 ||  || — || July 25, 2006 || Mount Lemmon || Mount Lemmon Survey ||  || align=right | 1.4 km || 
|-id=442 bgcolor=#fefefe
| 613442 ||  || — || July 26, 2006 || Reedy Creek || J. Broughton || (5026) || align=right data-sort-value="0.75" | 750 m || 
|-id=443 bgcolor=#fefefe
| 613443 ||  || — || July 21, 2006 || Mount Lemmon || Mount Lemmon Survey ||  || align=right | 1.7 km || 
|-id=444 bgcolor=#E9E9E9
| 613444 ||  || — || August 11, 2006 || Palomar || NEAT ||  || align=right | 1.3 km || 
|-id=445 bgcolor=#E9E9E9
| 613445 ||  || — || August 12, 2006 || Palomar || NEAT ||  || align=right | 1.1 km || 
|-id=446 bgcolor=#fefefe
| 613446 ||  || — || August 12, 2006 || Palomar || NEAT ||  || align=right data-sort-value="0.67" | 670 m || 
|-id=447 bgcolor=#E9E9E9
| 613447 ||  || — || August 12, 2006 || Palomar || NEAT ||  || align=right | 1.2 km || 
|-id=448 bgcolor=#fefefe
| 613448 ||  || — || August 13, 2006 || Palomar || NEAT ||  || align=right data-sort-value="0.59" | 590 m || 
|-id=449 bgcolor=#fefefe
| 613449 ||  || — || August 15, 2006 || Palomar || NEAT ||  || align=right | 1.7 km || 
|-id=450 bgcolor=#FFC2E0
| 613450 ||  || — || August 15, 2006 || Palomar || NEAT || APOPHA || align=right data-sort-value="0.49" | 490 m || 
|-id=451 bgcolor=#E9E9E9
| 613451 ||  || — || August 12, 2006 || Palomar || NEAT ||  || align=right | 3.4 km || 
|-id=452 bgcolor=#d6d6d6
| 613452 ||  || — || August 13, 2006 || Palomar || NEAT ||  || align=right | 2.0 km || 
|-id=453 bgcolor=#d6d6d6
| 613453 ||  || — || August 17, 2006 || Palomar || NEAT || Tj (2.96) || align=right | 3.9 km || 
|-id=454 bgcolor=#FA8072
| 613454 ||  || — || August 19, 2006 || Anderson Mesa || LONEOS ||  || align=right data-sort-value="0.91" | 910 m || 
|-id=455 bgcolor=#E9E9E9
| 613455 ||  || — || August 19, 2006 || Palomar || NEAT ||  || align=right | 2.7 km || 
|-id=456 bgcolor=#FA8072
| 613456 ||  || — || August 23, 2006 || Socorro || LINEAR ||  || align=right | 1.4 km || 
|-id=457 bgcolor=#E9E9E9
| 613457 ||  || — || August 17, 2006 || Palomar || NEAT ||  || align=right | 1.7 km || 
|-id=458 bgcolor=#d6d6d6
| 613458 ||  || — || August 27, 2006 || Kitt Peak || Spacewatch ||  || align=right | 2.0 km || 
|-id=459 bgcolor=#E9E9E9
| 613459 ||  || — || August 22, 2006 || Palomar || NEAT ||  || align=right data-sort-value="0.88" | 880 m || 
|-id=460 bgcolor=#FA8072
| 613460 ||  || — || August 28, 2006 || Catalina || CSS ||  || align=right data-sort-value="0.99" | 990 m || 
|-id=461 bgcolor=#E9E9E9
| 613461 ||  || — || August 29, 2006 || Catalina || CSS || (1547) || align=right | 1.6 km || 
|-id=462 bgcolor=#E9E9E9
| 613462 ||  || — || August 27, 2006 || Anderson Mesa || LONEOS ||  || align=right data-sort-value="0.89" | 890 m || 
|-id=463 bgcolor=#E9E9E9
| 613463 ||  || — || August 31, 2006 || Dax || Dax Obs. ||  || align=right | 1.4 km || 
|-id=464 bgcolor=#FA8072
| 613464 ||  || — || August 18, 2006 || Palomar || NEAT ||  || align=right data-sort-value="0.60" | 600 m || 
|-id=465 bgcolor=#E9E9E9
| 613465 ||  || — || August 19, 2006 || Kitt Peak || Spacewatch ||  || align=right | 1.1 km || 
|-id=466 bgcolor=#fefefe
| 613466 ||  || — || August 19, 2006 || Kitt Peak || Spacewatch ||  || align=right data-sort-value="0.40" | 400 m || 
|-id=467 bgcolor=#E9E9E9
| 613467 ||  || — || August 29, 2006 || Anderson Mesa || LONEOS ||  || align=right | 2.7 km || 
|-id=468 bgcolor=#C2E0FF
| 613468 ||  || — || August 28, 2006 || Apache Point || Apache Point Obs. || res3:5 || align=right | 199 km || 
|-id=469 bgcolor=#C2E0FF
| 613469 ||  || — || August 21, 2006 || Cerro Tololo || Cerro Tololo Obs. || res1:3critical || align=right | 170 km || 
|-id=470 bgcolor=#d6d6d6
| 613470 ||  || — || August 19, 2006 || Kitt Peak || Spacewatch ||  || align=right | 1.8 km || 
|-id=471 bgcolor=#FFC2E0
| 613471 ||  || — || September 12, 2006 || Catalina || CSS || ATE || align=right data-sort-value="0.12" | 120 m || 
|-id=472 bgcolor=#FA8072
| 613472 ||  || — || September 14, 2006 || Palomar || NEAT ||  || align=right data-sort-value="0.80" | 800 m || 
|-id=473 bgcolor=#fefefe
| 613473 ||  || — || September 14, 2006 || Palomar || NEAT || H || align=right data-sort-value="0.50" | 500 m || 
|-id=474 bgcolor=#E9E9E9
| 613474 ||  || — || September 15, 2006 || Kitt Peak || Spacewatch ||  || align=right | 1.1 km || 
|-id=475 bgcolor=#E9E9E9
| 613475 ||  || — || September 12, 2006 || Catalina || CSS ||  || align=right | 1.5 km || 
|-id=476 bgcolor=#E9E9E9
| 613476 ||  || — || September 12, 2006 || Catalina || CSS ||  || align=right | 1.8 km || 
|-id=477 bgcolor=#E9E9E9
| 613477 ||  || — || September 14, 2006 || Catalina || CSS ||  || align=right data-sort-value="0.87" | 870 m || 
|-id=478 bgcolor=#fefefe
| 613478 ||  || — || September 14, 2006 || Kitt Peak || Spacewatch ||  || align=right data-sort-value="0.66" | 660 m || 
|-id=479 bgcolor=#d6d6d6
| 613479 ||  || — || September 14, 2006 || Kitt Peak || Spacewatch || Tj (2.97) || align=right | 2.2 km || 
|-id=480 bgcolor=#fefefe
| 613480 ||  || — || September 15, 2006 || Kitt Peak || Spacewatch ||  || align=right data-sort-value="0.46" | 460 m || 
|-id=481 bgcolor=#fefefe
| 613481 ||  || — || September 15, 2006 || Kitt Peak || Spacewatch ||  || align=right data-sort-value="0.54" | 540 m || 
|-id=482 bgcolor=#fefefe
| 613482 ||  || — || September 15, 2006 || Kitt Peak || Spacewatch ||  || align=right data-sort-value="0.68" | 680 m || 
|-id=483 bgcolor=#fefefe
| 613483 ||  || — || September 15, 2006 || Kitt Peak || Spacewatch ||  || align=right data-sort-value="0.63" | 630 m || 
|-id=484 bgcolor=#E9E9E9
| 613484 ||  || — || September 15, 2006 || Kitt Peak || Spacewatch ||  || align=right data-sort-value="0.60" | 600 m || 
|-id=485 bgcolor=#E9E9E9
| 613485 ||  || — || September 15, 2006 || Kitt Peak || Spacewatch ||  || align=right data-sort-value="0.90" | 900 m || 
|-id=486 bgcolor=#E9E9E9
| 613486 ||  || — || September 15, 2006 || Kitt Peak || Spacewatch || EUN || align=right data-sort-value="0.60" | 600 m || 
|-id=487 bgcolor=#fefefe
| 613487 ||  || — || September 15, 2006 || Kitt Peak || Spacewatch ||  || align=right data-sort-value="0.48" | 480 m || 
|-id=488 bgcolor=#E9E9E9
| 613488 ||  || — || September 15, 2006 || Kitt Peak || Spacewatch ||  || align=right data-sort-value="0.78" | 780 m || 
|-id=489 bgcolor=#E9E9E9
| 613489 ||  || — || September 15, 2006 || Kitt Peak || Spacewatch ||  || align=right data-sort-value="0.86" | 860 m || 
|-id=490 bgcolor=#C2E0FF
| 613490 ||  || — || September 12, 2006 || Apache Point || Apache Point Obs. || NT || align=right | 136 km || 
|-id=491 bgcolor=#fefefe
| 613491 ||  || — || September 14, 2006 || Mauna Kea || J. Masiero || MAS || align=right data-sort-value="0.66" | 660 m || 
|-id=492 bgcolor=#d6d6d6
| 613492 ||  || — || September 14, 2006 || Mauna Kea || J. Masiero || THM || align=right | 2.1 km || 
|-id=493 bgcolor=#E9E9E9
| 613493 ||  || — || September 14, 2006 || Mauna Kea || J. Masiero ||  || align=right data-sort-value="0.69" | 690 m || 
|-id=494 bgcolor=#E9E9E9
| 613494 ||  || — || September 14, 2006 || Mauna Kea || J. Masiero ||  || align=right | 1.8 km || 
|-id=495 bgcolor=#E9E9E9
| 613495 ||  || — || September 14, 2006 || Mauna Kea || J. Masiero ||  || align=right | 1.0 km || 
|-id=496 bgcolor=#FFC2E0
| 613496 ||  || — || September 17, 2006 || Kitt Peak || Spacewatch || AMO || align=right data-sort-value="0.32" | 320 m || 
|-id=497 bgcolor=#E9E9E9
| 613497 ||  || — || September 17, 2006 || Anderson Mesa || LONEOS ||  || align=right data-sort-value="0.94" | 940 m || 
|-id=498 bgcolor=#FA8072
| 613498 ||  || — || September 17, 2006 || Anderson Mesa || LONEOS ||  || align=right | 1.4 km || 
|-id=499 bgcolor=#E9E9E9
| 613499 ||  || — || September 17, 2006 || Kitt Peak || Spacewatch || KON || align=right data-sort-value="0.80" | 800 m || 
|-id=500 bgcolor=#fefefe
| 613500 ||  || — || September 17, 2006 || Catalina || CSS ||  || align=right data-sort-value="0.51" | 510 m || 
|}

613501–613600 

|-bgcolor=#E9E9E9
| 613501 ||  || — || September 18, 2006 || Catalina || CSS ||  || align=right data-sort-value="0.78" | 780 m || 
|-id=502 bgcolor=#FA8072
| 613502 ||  || — || September 19, 2006 || Siding Spring || SSS ||  || align=right data-sort-value="0.97" | 970 m || 
|-id=503 bgcolor=#fefefe
| 613503 ||  || — || September 19, 2006 || Kitt Peak || Spacewatch ||  || align=right data-sort-value="0.60" | 600 m || 
|-id=504 bgcolor=#fefefe
| 613504 ||  || — || September 18, 2006 || Kitt Peak || Spacewatch ||  || align=right data-sort-value="0.39" | 390 m || 
|-id=505 bgcolor=#fefefe
| 613505 ||  || — || September 18, 2006 || Kitt Peak || Spacewatch ||  || align=right data-sort-value="0.51" | 510 m || 
|-id=506 bgcolor=#E9E9E9
| 613506 ||  || — || September 18, 2006 || Kitt Peak || Spacewatch ||  || align=right data-sort-value="0.77" | 770 m || 
|-id=507 bgcolor=#E9E9E9
| 613507 ||  || — || September 19, 2006 || Kitt Peak || Spacewatch ||  || align=right data-sort-value="0.54" | 540 m || 
|-id=508 bgcolor=#fefefe
| 613508 ||  || — || September 19, 2006 || Kitt Peak || Spacewatch ||  || align=right data-sort-value="0.48" | 480 m || 
|-id=509 bgcolor=#E9E9E9
| 613509 ||  || — || September 19, 2006 || Kitt Peak || Spacewatch ||  || align=right | 1.5 km || 
|-id=510 bgcolor=#E9E9E9
| 613510 ||  || — || September 19, 2006 || Anderson Mesa || LONEOS ||  || align=right | 1.6 km || 
|-id=511 bgcolor=#E9E9E9
| 613511 ||  || — || September 16, 2006 || Catalina || CSS ||  || align=right data-sort-value="0.62" | 620 m || 
|-id=512 bgcolor=#FFC2E0
| 613512 ||  || — || September 27, 2006 || Catalina || CSS || APO || align=right data-sort-value="0.64" | 640 m || 
|-id=513 bgcolor=#E9E9E9
| 613513 ||  || — || September 19, 2006 || Kitt Peak || Spacewatch ||  || align=right | 1.0 km || 
|-id=514 bgcolor=#d6d6d6
| 613514 ||  || — || September 19, 2006 || Kitt Peak || Spacewatch ||  || align=right | 1.6 km || 
|-id=515 bgcolor=#E9E9E9
| 613515 ||  || — || September 19, 2006 || Kitt Peak || Spacewatch || MIS || align=right data-sort-value="0.94" | 940 m || 
|-id=516 bgcolor=#E9E9E9
| 613516 ||  || — || September 19, 2006 || Kitt Peak || Spacewatch ||  || align=right data-sort-value="0.62" | 620 m || 
|-id=517 bgcolor=#E9E9E9
| 613517 ||  || — || September 19, 2006 || Kitt Peak || Spacewatch ||  || align=right data-sort-value="0.56" | 560 m || 
|-id=518 bgcolor=#E9E9E9
| 613518 ||  || — || September 21, 2006 || Bergisch Gladbach || W. Bickel ||  || align=right | 1.2 km || 
|-id=519 bgcolor=#fefefe
| 613519 ||  || — || September 23, 2006 || Kitt Peak || Spacewatch ||  || align=right data-sort-value="0.51" | 510 m || 
|-id=520 bgcolor=#fefefe
| 613520 ||  || — || September 24, 2006 || Kitt Peak || Spacewatch ||  || align=right data-sort-value="0.45" | 450 m || 
|-id=521 bgcolor=#fefefe
| 613521 ||  || — || September 24, 2006 || Kitt Peak || Spacewatch ||  || align=right data-sort-value="0.39" | 390 m || 
|-id=522 bgcolor=#E9E9E9
| 613522 ||  || — || September 24, 2006 || Kitt Peak || Spacewatch ||  || align=right | 1.4 km || 
|-id=523 bgcolor=#fefefe
| 613523 ||  || — || September 25, 2006 || Kitt Peak || Spacewatch ||  || align=right data-sort-value="0.60" | 600 m || 
|-id=524 bgcolor=#E9E9E9
| 613524 ||  || — || September 25, 2006 || Kitt Peak || Spacewatch ||  || align=right | 2.1 km || 
|-id=525 bgcolor=#fefefe
| 613525 ||  || — || September 25, 2006 || Mount Lemmon || Mount Lemmon Survey ||  || align=right data-sort-value="0.46" | 460 m || 
|-id=526 bgcolor=#d6d6d6
| 613526 ||  || — || September 26, 2006 || Kitt Peak || Spacewatch || KOR || align=right | 1.5 km || 
|-id=527 bgcolor=#FFC2E0
| 613527 ||  || — || September 26, 2006 || Mount Lemmon || Mount Lemmon Survey || AMO || align=right data-sort-value="0.39" | 390 m || 
|-id=528 bgcolor=#FA8072
| 613528 ||  || — || September 27, 2006 || Mayhill || A. Lowe ||  || align=right data-sort-value="0.76" | 760 m || 
|-id=529 bgcolor=#FA8072
| 613529 ||  || — || September 29, 2006 || Siding Spring || SSS ||  || align=right | 1.1 km || 
|-id=530 bgcolor=#E9E9E9
| 613530 ||  || — || September 22, 2006 || Anderson Mesa || LONEOS ||  || align=right | 1.3 km || 
|-id=531 bgcolor=#E9E9E9
| 613531 ||  || — || September 24, 2006 || Kitt Peak || Spacewatch ||  || align=right | 1.2 km || 
|-id=532 bgcolor=#fefefe
| 613532 ||  || — || September 25, 2006 || Kitt Peak || Spacewatch ||  || align=right data-sort-value="0.66" | 660 m || 
|-id=533 bgcolor=#FA8072
| 613533 ||  || — || September 26, 2006 || Socorro || LINEAR ||  || align=right data-sort-value="0.83" | 830 m || 
|-id=534 bgcolor=#d6d6d6
| 613534 ||  || — || September 26, 2006 || Mount Lemmon || Mount Lemmon Survey ||  || align=right | 2.6 km || 
|-id=535 bgcolor=#fefefe
| 613535 ||  || — || September 28, 2006 || Kitt Peak || Spacewatch ||  || align=right data-sort-value="0.54" | 540 m || 
|-id=536 bgcolor=#E9E9E9
| 613536 ||  || — || September 26, 2006 || Kitt Peak || Spacewatch ||  || align=right | 1.3 km || 
|-id=537 bgcolor=#E9E9E9
| 613537 ||  || — || September 26, 2006 || Kitt Peak || Spacewatch ||  || align=right data-sort-value="0.49" | 490 m || 
|-id=538 bgcolor=#E9E9E9
| 613538 ||  || — || September 26, 2006 || Kitt Peak || Spacewatch ||  || align=right | 1.6 km || 
|-id=539 bgcolor=#fefefe
| 613539 ||  || — || September 26, 2006 || Kitt Peak || Spacewatch ||  || align=right data-sort-value="0.49" | 490 m || 
|-id=540 bgcolor=#fefefe
| 613540 ||  || — || September 26, 2006 || Kitt Peak || Spacewatch ||  || align=right data-sort-value="0.52" | 520 m || 
|-id=541 bgcolor=#E9E9E9
| 613541 ||  || — || September 26, 2006 || Kitt Peak || Spacewatch ||  || align=right data-sort-value="0.99" | 990 m || 
|-id=542 bgcolor=#d6d6d6
| 613542 ||  || — || September 26, 2006 || Kitt Peak || Spacewatch ||  || align=right | 1.6 km || 
|-id=543 bgcolor=#E9E9E9
| 613543 ||  || — || September 26, 2006 || Kitt Peak || Spacewatch ||  || align=right data-sort-value="0.58" | 580 m || 
|-id=544 bgcolor=#E9E9E9
| 613544 ||  || — || September 27, 2006 || Kitt Peak || Spacewatch || KON || align=right data-sort-value="0.59" | 590 m || 
|-id=545 bgcolor=#E9E9E9
| 613545 ||  || — || September 28, 2006 || Kitt Peak || Spacewatch ||  || align=right | 1.6 km || 
|-id=546 bgcolor=#E9E9E9
| 613546 ||  || — || September 25, 2006 || Socorro || LINEAR ||  || align=right | 1.4 km || 
|-id=547 bgcolor=#E9E9E9
| 613547 ||  || — || September 27, 2006 || Kitt Peak || Spacewatch ||  || align=right data-sort-value="0.76" | 760 m || 
|-id=548 bgcolor=#E9E9E9
| 613548 ||  || — || September 27, 2006 || Kitt Peak || Spacewatch ||  || align=right data-sort-value="0.63" | 630 m || 
|-id=549 bgcolor=#E9E9E9
| 613549 ||  || — || September 27, 2006 || Kitt Peak || Spacewatch ||  || align=right | 1.3 km || 
|-id=550 bgcolor=#E9E9E9
| 613550 ||  || — || September 28, 2006 || Kitt Peak || Spacewatch ||  || align=right data-sort-value="0.65" | 650 m || 
|-id=551 bgcolor=#FA8072
| 613551 ||  || — || September 28, 2006 || Catalina || CSS ||  || align=right data-sort-value="0.91" | 910 m || 
|-id=552 bgcolor=#E9E9E9
| 613552 ||  || — || September 30, 2006 || Catalina || CSS ||  || align=right data-sort-value="0.78" | 780 m || 
|-id=553 bgcolor=#E9E9E9
| 613553 ||  || — || September 30, 2006 || Mount Lemmon || Mount Lemmon Survey || ADE || align=right | 2.2 km || 
|-id=554 bgcolor=#E9E9E9
| 613554 ||  || — || September 30, 2006 || Mount Lemmon || Mount Lemmon Survey ||  || align=right data-sort-value="0.76" | 760 m || 
|-id=555 bgcolor=#E9E9E9
| 613555 ||  || — || September 16, 2006 || Apache Point || A. C. Becker ||  || align=right data-sort-value="0.82" | 820 m || 
|-id=556 bgcolor=#fefefe
| 613556 ||  || — || September 17, 2006 || Apache Point || A. C. Becker ||  || align=right data-sort-value="0.42" | 420 m || 
|-id=557 bgcolor=#E9E9E9
| 613557 ||  || — || September 27, 2006 || Apache Point || A. C. Becker ||  || align=right | 1.0 km || 
|-id=558 bgcolor=#E9E9E9
| 613558 ||  || — || September 29, 2006 || Apache Point || A. C. Becker ||  || align=right | 1.0 km || 
|-id=559 bgcolor=#d6d6d6
| 613559 ||  || — || September 18, 2006 || Kitt Peak || Spacewatch ||  || align=right | 2.0 km || 
|-id=560 bgcolor=#E9E9E9
| 613560 ||  || — || September 30, 2006 || Mount Lemmon || Mount Lemmon Survey ||  || align=right | 1.4 km || 
|-id=561 bgcolor=#fefefe
| 613561 ||  || — || September 17, 2006 || Kitt Peak || Spacewatch ||  || align=right data-sort-value="0.48" | 480 m || 
|-id=562 bgcolor=#E9E9E9
| 613562 ||  || — || September 17, 2006 || Vail-Jarnac || Jarnac Obs. ||  || align=right | 1.6 km || 
|-id=563 bgcolor=#E9E9E9
| 613563 ||  || — || September 17, 2006 || Kitt Peak || Spacewatch ||  || align=right data-sort-value="0.57" | 570 m || 
|-id=564 bgcolor=#E9E9E9
| 613564 ||  || — || September 28, 2006 || Mount Lemmon || Mount Lemmon Survey ||  || align=right data-sort-value="0.85" | 850 m || 
|-id=565 bgcolor=#E9E9E9
| 613565 ||  || — || September 28, 2006 || Catalina || CSS ||  || align=right | 1.1 km || 
|-id=566 bgcolor=#E9E9E9
| 613566 ||  || — || September 30, 2006 || Catalina || CSS ||  || align=right data-sort-value="0.83" | 830 m || 
|-id=567 bgcolor=#fefefe
| 613567 ||  || — || September 27, 2006 || Mount Lemmon || Mount Lemmon Survey ||  || align=right data-sort-value="0.72" | 720 m || 
|-id=568 bgcolor=#E9E9E9
| 613568 ||  || — || October 1, 2006 || Kitt Peak || Spacewatch ||  || align=right data-sort-value="0.64" | 640 m || 
|-id=569 bgcolor=#FFC2E0
| 613569 ||  || — || October 12, 2006 || Siding Spring || SSS || ATEPHA || align=right data-sort-value="0.15" | 150 m || 
|-id=570 bgcolor=#E9E9E9
| 613570 ||  || — || October 4, 2006 || Mount Lemmon || Mount Lemmon Survey ||  || align=right | 1.4 km || 
|-id=571 bgcolor=#fefefe
| 613571 ||  || — || October 11, 2006 || Kitt Peak || Spacewatch ||  || align=right data-sort-value="0.57" | 570 m || 
|-id=572 bgcolor=#fefefe
| 613572 ||  || — || October 12, 2006 || Kitt Peak || Spacewatch ||  || align=right data-sort-value="0.45" | 450 m || 
|-id=573 bgcolor=#fefefe
| 613573 ||  || — || October 12, 2006 || Kitt Peak || Spacewatch ||  || align=right data-sort-value="0.56" | 560 m || 
|-id=574 bgcolor=#d6d6d6
| 613574 ||  || — || October 12, 2006 || Kitt Peak || Spacewatch ||  || align=right | 2.4 km || 
|-id=575 bgcolor=#E9E9E9
| 613575 ||  || — || October 11, 2006 || Palomar || NEAT || (194) || align=right | 2.0 km || 
|-id=576 bgcolor=#E9E9E9
| 613576 ||  || — || October 12, 2006 || Kitt Peak || Spacewatch ||  || align=right | 1.2 km || 
|-id=577 bgcolor=#E9E9E9
| 613577 ||  || — || October 12, 2006 || Palomar || NEAT ||  || align=right | 1.4 km || 
|-id=578 bgcolor=#E9E9E9
| 613578 ||  || — || October 13, 2006 || Kitt Peak || Spacewatch || ADE || align=right | 1.3 km || 
|-id=579 bgcolor=#E9E9E9
| 613579 ||  || — || October 13, 2006 || Kitt Peak || Spacewatch ||  || align=right data-sort-value="0.83" | 830 m || 
|-id=580 bgcolor=#E9E9E9
| 613580 ||  || — || October 13, 2006 || Kitt Peak || Spacewatch ||  || align=right | 1.7 km || 
|-id=581 bgcolor=#E9E9E9
| 613581 ||  || — || October 13, 2006 || Kitt Peak || Spacewatch ||  || align=right | 1.1 km || 
|-id=582 bgcolor=#fefefe
| 613582 ||  || — || October 13, 2006 || Kitt Peak || Spacewatch ||  || align=right data-sort-value="0.53" | 530 m || 
|-id=583 bgcolor=#fefefe
| 613583 ||  || — || October 13, 2006 || Kitt Peak || Spacewatch ||  || align=right data-sort-value="0.62" | 620 m || 
|-id=584 bgcolor=#E9E9E9
| 613584 ||  || — || October 15, 2006 || Kitt Peak || Spacewatch || KON || align=right data-sort-value="0.69" | 690 m || 
|-id=585 bgcolor=#fefefe
| 613585 ||  || — || October 15, 2006 || Kitt Peak || Spacewatch || MAS || align=right data-sort-value="0.53" | 530 m || 
|-id=586 bgcolor=#E9E9E9
| 613586 ||  || — || October 1, 2006 || Apache Point || A. C. Becker ||  || align=right | 1.9 km || 
|-id=587 bgcolor=#d6d6d6
| 613587 ||  || — || October 1, 2006 || Apache Point || A. C. Becker ||  || align=right | 1.9 km || 
|-id=588 bgcolor=#E9E9E9
| 613588 ||  || — || October 1, 2006 || Apache Point || A. C. Becker ||  || align=right | 1.2 km || 
|-id=589 bgcolor=#E9E9E9
| 613589 ||  || — || October 2, 2006 || Mount Lemmon || Mount Lemmon Survey ||  || align=right data-sort-value="0.76" | 760 m || 
|-id=590 bgcolor=#E9E9E9
| 613590 ||  || — || October 2, 2006 || Mount Lemmon || Mount Lemmon Survey ||  || align=right | 1.1 km || 
|-id=591 bgcolor=#E9E9E9
| 613591 ||  || — || October 12, 2006 || Kitt Peak || Spacewatch ||  || align=right | 1.3 km || 
|-id=592 bgcolor=#E9E9E9
| 613592 ||  || — || October 17, 2006 || Piszkesteto || K. Sárneczky, Z. Kuli ||  || align=right data-sort-value="0.62" | 620 m || 
|-id=593 bgcolor=#E9E9E9
| 613593 ||  || — || October 16, 2006 || Catalina || CSS ||  || align=right data-sort-value="0.59" | 590 m || 
|-id=594 bgcolor=#E9E9E9
| 613594 ||  || — || October 16, 2006 || Kitt Peak || Spacewatch ||  || align=right | 1.1 km || 
|-id=595 bgcolor=#FA8072
| 613595 ||  || — || October 16, 2006 || Kitt Peak || Spacewatch || H || align=right data-sort-value="0.58" | 580 m || 
|-id=596 bgcolor=#E9E9E9
| 613596 ||  || — || October 16, 2006 || Kitt Peak || Spacewatch ||  || align=right data-sort-value="0.79" | 790 m || 
|-id=597 bgcolor=#E9E9E9
| 613597 ||  || — || October 16, 2006 || Kitt Peak || Spacewatch ||  || align=right data-sort-value="0.70" | 700 m || 
|-id=598 bgcolor=#d6d6d6
| 613598 ||  || — || October 16, 2006 || Kitt Peak || Spacewatch ||  || align=right | 1.6 km || 
|-id=599 bgcolor=#E9E9E9
| 613599 ||  || — || October 16, 2006 || Kitt Peak || Spacewatch || JUN || align=right | 1.4 km || 
|-id=600 bgcolor=#d6d6d6
| 613600 ||  || — || October 16, 2006 || Kitt Peak || Spacewatch ||  || align=right | 1.4 km || 
|}

613601–613700 

|-bgcolor=#E9E9E9
| 613601 ||  || — || October 16, 2006 || Kitt Peak || Spacewatch || KON || align=right | 1.7 km || 
|-id=602 bgcolor=#E9E9E9
| 613602 ||  || — || October 19, 2006 || Kitt Peak || Spacewatch ||  || align=right data-sort-value="0.58" | 580 m || 
|-id=603 bgcolor=#E9E9E9
| 613603 ||  || — || October 17, 2006 || Kitt Peak || Spacewatch ||  || align=right data-sort-value="0.79" | 790 m || 
|-id=604 bgcolor=#E9E9E9
| 613604 ||  || — || October 17, 2006 || Kitt Peak || Spacewatch ||  || align=right data-sort-value="0.62" | 620 m || 
|-id=605 bgcolor=#fefefe
| 613605 ||  || — || October 19, 2006 || Kitt Peak || Spacewatch || ERI || align=right data-sort-value="0.44" | 440 m || 
|-id=606 bgcolor=#fefefe
| 613606 ||  || — || October 19, 2006 || Kitt Peak || Spacewatch ||  || align=right data-sort-value="0.54" | 540 m || 
|-id=607 bgcolor=#E9E9E9
| 613607 ||  || — || October 19, 2006 || Kitt Peak || Spacewatch ||  || align=right | 2.0 km || 
|-id=608 bgcolor=#E9E9E9
| 613608 ||  || — || October 19, 2006 || Kitt Peak || Spacewatch ||  || align=right | 1.0 km || 
|-id=609 bgcolor=#E9E9E9
| 613609 ||  || — || October 19, 2006 || Kitt Peak || Spacewatch ||  || align=right | 1.5 km || 
|-id=610 bgcolor=#E9E9E9
| 613610 ||  || — || October 19, 2006 || Mount Lemmon || Mount Lemmon Survey ||  || align=right data-sort-value="0.64" | 640 m || 
|-id=611 bgcolor=#E9E9E9
| 613611 ||  || — || October 19, 2006 || Palomar || NEAT ||  || align=right data-sort-value="0.80" | 800 m || 
|-id=612 bgcolor=#fefefe
| 613612 ||  || — || October 19, 2006 || Kitt Peak || Spacewatch || H || align=right data-sort-value="0.65" | 650 m || 
|-id=613 bgcolor=#E9E9E9
| 613613 ||  || — || October 20, 2006 || Mount Lemmon || Mount Lemmon Survey ||  || align=right | 1.7 km || 
|-id=614 bgcolor=#E9E9E9
| 613614 ||  || — || October 21, 2006 || Mount Lemmon || Mount Lemmon Survey ||  || align=right data-sort-value="0.80" | 800 m || 
|-id=615 bgcolor=#E9E9E9
| 613615 ||  || — || October 21, 2006 || Mount Lemmon || Mount Lemmon Survey || (1547) || align=right | 1.1 km || 
|-id=616 bgcolor=#fefefe
| 613616 ||  || — || October 21, 2006 || Mount Lemmon || Mount Lemmon Survey ||  || align=right data-sort-value="0.52" | 520 m || 
|-id=617 bgcolor=#E9E9E9
| 613617 ||  || — || October 22, 2006 || Kitt Peak || Spacewatch ||  || align=right | 1.5 km || 
|-id=618 bgcolor=#E9E9E9
| 613618 ||  || — || October 19, 2006 || Mount Lemmon || Mount Lemmon Survey ||  || align=right | 1.1 km || 
|-id=619 bgcolor=#C2E0FF
| 613619 ||  || — || October 22, 2006 || La Palma || La Palma Obs. || centaur || align=right | 76 km || 
|-id=620 bgcolor=#C2E0FF
| 613620 ||  || — || October 22, 2006 || La Palma || La Palma Obs. || plutinocritical || align=right | 120 km || 
|-id=621 bgcolor=#E9E9E9
| 613621 ||  || — || October 19, 2006 || Catalina || CSS || JUN || align=right | 1.2 km || 
|-id=622 bgcolor=#fefefe
| 613622 ||  || — || October 20, 2006 || Kitt Peak || Spacewatch || NYS || align=right data-sort-value="0.64" | 640 m || 
|-id=623 bgcolor=#fefefe
| 613623 ||  || — || October 20, 2006 || Kitt Peak || Spacewatch ||  || align=right data-sort-value="0.45" | 450 m || 
|-id=624 bgcolor=#E9E9E9
| 613624 ||  || — || October 20, 2006 || Kitt Peak || Spacewatch ||  || align=right data-sort-value="0.70" | 700 m || 
|-id=625 bgcolor=#E9E9E9
| 613625 ||  || — || October 23, 2006 || Kitt Peak || Spacewatch ||  || align=right data-sort-value="0.61" | 610 m || 
|-id=626 bgcolor=#FFC2E0
| 613626 ||  || — || October 30, 2006 || Mount Lemmon || Mount Lemmon Survey || APO || align=right data-sort-value="0.36" | 360 m || 
|-id=627 bgcolor=#E9E9E9
| 613627 ||  || — || October 19, 2006 || Mount Lemmon || Mount Lemmon Survey ||  || align=right | 1.7 km || 
|-id=628 bgcolor=#E9E9E9
| 613628 ||  || — || October 20, 2006 || Palomar || NEAT ||  || align=right | 1.3 km || 
|-id=629 bgcolor=#fefefe
| 613629 ||  || — || October 20, 2006 || Palomar || NEAT ||  || align=right data-sort-value="0.60" | 600 m || 
|-id=630 bgcolor=#fefefe
| 613630 ||  || — || October 21, 2006 || Kitt Peak || Spacewatch || H || align=right data-sort-value="0.51" | 510 m || 
|-id=631 bgcolor=#fefefe
| 613631 ||  || — || October 21, 2006 || Palomar || NEAT ||  || align=right data-sort-value="0.70" | 700 m || 
|-id=632 bgcolor=#fefefe
| 613632 ||  || — || October 22, 2006 || Kitt Peak || Spacewatch ||  || align=right data-sort-value="0.48" | 480 m || 
|-id=633 bgcolor=#E9E9E9
| 613633 ||  || — || October 22, 2006 || Kitt Peak || Spacewatch ||  || align=right data-sort-value="0.73" | 730 m || 
|-id=634 bgcolor=#FA8072
| 613634 ||  || — || October 27, 2006 || Mount Lemmon || Mount Lemmon Survey ||  || align=right data-sort-value="0.42" | 420 m || 
|-id=635 bgcolor=#E9E9E9
| 613635 ||  || — || October 28, 2006 || Kitt Peak || Spacewatch ||  || align=right | 2.1 km || 
|-id=636 bgcolor=#E9E9E9
| 613636 ||  || — || October 28, 2006 || Mount Lemmon || Mount Lemmon Survey ||  || align=right | 1.2 km || 
|-id=637 bgcolor=#fefefe
| 613637 ||  || — || October 28, 2006 || Kitt Peak || Spacewatch ||  || align=right data-sort-value="0.57" | 570 m || 
|-id=638 bgcolor=#fefefe
| 613638 ||  || — || October 28, 2006 || Kitt Peak || Spacewatch ||  || align=right data-sort-value="0.42" | 420 m || 
|-id=639 bgcolor=#d6d6d6
| 613639 ||  || — || October 19, 2006 || Kitt Peak || M. W. Buie ||  || align=right | 1.8 km || 
|-id=640 bgcolor=#E9E9E9
| 613640 ||  || — || October 16, 2006 || Kitt Peak || Spacewatch ||  || align=right data-sort-value="0.69" | 690 m || 
|-id=641 bgcolor=#d6d6d6
| 613641 ||  || — || October 22, 2006 || Kitt Peak || Spacewatch || Tj (2.95) || align=right | 3.9 km || 
|-id=642 bgcolor=#E9E9E9
| 613642 ||  || — || October 16, 2006 || Kitt Peak || Spacewatch ||  || align=right data-sort-value="0.79" | 790 m || 
|-id=643 bgcolor=#E9E9E9
| 613643 ||  || — || October 19, 2006 || Kitt Peak || Spacewatch || HOF || align=right | 1.6 km || 
|-id=644 bgcolor=#E9E9E9
| 613644 ||  || — || October 21, 2006 || Kitt Peak || Spacewatch ||  || align=right | 1.7 km || 
|-id=645 bgcolor=#FA8072
| 613645 ||  || — || November 1, 2006 || Mount Lemmon || Mount Lemmon Survey ||  || align=right data-sort-value="0.32" | 320 m || 
|-id=646 bgcolor=#E9E9E9
| 613646 ||  || — || November 1, 2006 || Mount Lemmon || Mount Lemmon Survey ||  || align=right | 1.1 km || 
|-id=647 bgcolor=#E9E9E9
| 613647 ||  || — || November 9, 2006 || Kitt Peak || Spacewatch ||  || align=right data-sort-value="0.48" | 480 m || 
|-id=648 bgcolor=#fefefe
| 613648 ||  || — || November 11, 2006 || Mount Lemmon || Mount Lemmon Survey ||  || align=right data-sort-value="0.56" | 560 m || 
|-id=649 bgcolor=#fefefe
| 613649 ||  || — || November 9, 2006 || Kitt Peak || Spacewatch ||  || align=right data-sort-value="0.50" | 500 m || 
|-id=650 bgcolor=#E9E9E9
| 613650 ||  || — || November 10, 2006 || Kitt Peak || Spacewatch ||  || align=right data-sort-value="0.93" | 930 m || 
|-id=651 bgcolor=#E9E9E9
| 613651 ||  || — || November 12, 2006 || Mount Lemmon || Mount Lemmon Survey ||  || align=right | 1.3 km || 
|-id=652 bgcolor=#FA8072
| 613652 ||  || — || November 13, 2006 || Kitt Peak || Spacewatch ||  || align=right data-sort-value="0.77" | 770 m || 
|-id=653 bgcolor=#E9E9E9
| 613653 ||  || — || November 10, 2006 || Kitt Peak || Spacewatch ||  || align=right | 1.2 km || 
|-id=654 bgcolor=#fefefe
| 613654 ||  || — || November 11, 2006 || Kitt Peak || Spacewatch ||  || align=right data-sort-value="0.47" | 470 m || 
|-id=655 bgcolor=#E9E9E9
| 613655 ||  || — || November 11, 2006 || Kitt Peak || Spacewatch ||  || align=right | 1.9 km || 
|-id=656 bgcolor=#E9E9E9
| 613656 ||  || — || November 11, 2006 || Goodricke-Pigott || R. A. Tucker ||  || align=right data-sort-value="0.85" | 850 m || 
|-id=657 bgcolor=#E9E9E9
| 613657 ||  || — || November 11, 2006 || Kitt Peak || Spacewatch ||  || align=right data-sort-value="0.65" | 650 m || 
|-id=658 bgcolor=#E9E9E9
| 613658 ||  || — || November 11, 2006 || Kitt Peak || Spacewatch ||  || align=right | 1.5 km || 
|-id=659 bgcolor=#E9E9E9
| 613659 ||  || — || November 11, 2006 || Mount Lemmon || Mount Lemmon Survey ||  || align=right data-sort-value="0.66" | 660 m || 
|-id=660 bgcolor=#fefefe
| 613660 ||  || — || November 13, 2006 || Mount Lemmon || Mount Lemmon Survey ||  || align=right data-sort-value="0.55" | 550 m || 
|-id=661 bgcolor=#fefefe
| 613661 ||  || — || November 13, 2006 || Kitt Peak || Spacewatch ||  || align=right data-sort-value="0.85" | 850 m || 
|-id=662 bgcolor=#E9E9E9
| 613662 ||  || — || November 14, 2006 || Mount Lemmon || Mount Lemmon Survey ||  || align=right data-sort-value="0.61" | 610 m || 
|-id=663 bgcolor=#E9E9E9
| 613663 ||  || — || November 14, 2006 || Mount Lemmon || Mount Lemmon Survey ||  || align=right | 1.8 km || 
|-id=664 bgcolor=#E9E9E9
| 613664 ||  || — || November 11, 2006 || Catalina || CSS ||  || align=right data-sort-value="0.76" | 760 m || 
|-id=665 bgcolor=#fefefe
| 613665 ||  || — || November 13, 2006 || Kitt Peak || Spacewatch ||  || align=right data-sort-value="0.74" | 740 m || 
|-id=666 bgcolor=#E9E9E9
| 613666 ||  || — || November 13, 2006 || Kitt Peak || Spacewatch ||  || align=right | 1.5 km || 
|-id=667 bgcolor=#E9E9E9
| 613667 ||  || — || November 14, 2006 || Catalina || CSS ||  || align=right data-sort-value="0.77" | 770 m || 
|-id=668 bgcolor=#E9E9E9
| 613668 ||  || — || November 14, 2006 || Kitt Peak || Spacewatch ||  || align=right data-sort-value="0.93" | 930 m || 
|-id=669 bgcolor=#E9E9E9
| 613669 ||  || — || November 15, 2006 || Kitt Peak || Spacewatch ||  || align=right | 1.5 km || 
|-id=670 bgcolor=#E9E9E9
| 613670 ||  || — || November 15, 2006 || Kitt Peak || Spacewatch ||  || align=right | 1.2 km || 
|-id=671 bgcolor=#E9E9E9
| 613671 ||  || — || November 15, 2006 || Kitt Peak || Spacewatch ||  || align=right | 1.1 km || 
|-id=672 bgcolor=#E9E9E9
| 613672 ||  || — || November 15, 2006 || Kitt Peak || Spacewatch ||  || align=right | 1.3 km || 
|-id=673 bgcolor=#fefefe
| 613673 ||  || — || November 15, 2006 || Catalina || CSS || H || align=right data-sort-value="0.67" | 670 m || 
|-id=674 bgcolor=#FA8072
| 613674 ||  || — || November 10, 2006 || Kitt Peak || Spacewatch ||  || align=right data-sort-value="0.48" | 480 m || 
|-id=675 bgcolor=#FA8072
| 613675 ||  || — || November 19, 2006 || Catalina || CSS ||  || align=right data-sort-value="0.52" | 520 m || 
|-id=676 bgcolor=#FFC2E0
| 613676 ||  || — || November 21, 2006 || Mount Lemmon || Mount Lemmon Survey || ATI || align=right data-sort-value="0.60" | 600 m || 
|-id=677 bgcolor=#E9E9E9
| 613677 ||  || — || November 16, 2006 || Kitt Peak || Spacewatch ||  || align=right | 2.0 km || 
|-id=678 bgcolor=#E9E9E9
| 613678 ||  || — || November 16, 2006 || Kitt Peak || Spacewatch ||  || align=right | 1.2 km || 
|-id=679 bgcolor=#FA8072
| 613679 ||  || — || November 23, 2006 || Mount Lemmon || Mount Lemmon Survey ||  || align=right | 2.6 km || 
|-id=680 bgcolor=#fefefe
| 613680 ||  || — || November 16, 2006 || Kitt Peak || Spacewatch ||  || align=right data-sort-value="0.45" | 450 m || 
|-id=681 bgcolor=#fefefe
| 613681 ||  || — || November 17, 2006 || Mount Lemmon || Mount Lemmon Survey || NYS || align=right data-sort-value="0.60" | 600 m || 
|-id=682 bgcolor=#E9E9E9
| 613682 ||  || — || November 18, 2006 || Kitt Peak || Spacewatch ||  || align=right data-sort-value="0.54" | 540 m || 
|-id=683 bgcolor=#E9E9E9
| 613683 ||  || — || November 18, 2006 || Kitt Peak || Spacewatch ||  || align=right | 1.2 km || 
|-id=684 bgcolor=#E9E9E9
| 613684 ||  || — || November 19, 2006 || Kitt Peak || Spacewatch ||  || align=right | 1.1 km || 
|-id=685 bgcolor=#E9E9E9
| 613685 ||  || — || November 19, 2006 || Kitt Peak || Spacewatch ||  || align=right data-sort-value="0.89" | 890 m || 
|-id=686 bgcolor=#fefefe
| 613686 ||  || — || November 19, 2006 || Kitt Peak || Spacewatch ||  || align=right data-sort-value="0.52" | 520 m || 
|-id=687 bgcolor=#E9E9E9
| 613687 ||  || — || November 19, 2006 || Kitt Peak || Spacewatch ||  || align=right data-sort-value="0.88" | 880 m || 
|-id=688 bgcolor=#fefefe
| 613688 ||  || — || November 19, 2006 || Kitt Peak || Spacewatch ||  || align=right | 1.2 km || 
|-id=689 bgcolor=#fefefe
| 613689 ||  || — || November 19, 2006 || Kitt Peak || Spacewatch ||  || align=right data-sort-value="0.56" | 560 m || 
|-id=690 bgcolor=#E9E9E9
| 613690 ||  || — || November 26, 2006 || 7300 || W. K. Y. Yeung ||  || align=right | 2.3 km || 
|-id=691 bgcolor=#fefefe
| 613691 ||  || — || November 23, 2006 || Kitt Peak || Spacewatch ||  || align=right data-sort-value="0.54" | 540 m || 
|-id=692 bgcolor=#fefefe
| 613692 ||  || — || November 24, 2006 || Mount Lemmon || Mount Lemmon Survey ||  || align=right data-sort-value="0.53" | 530 m || 
|-id=693 bgcolor=#E9E9E9
| 613693 ||  || — || November 25, 2006 || Kitt Peak || Spacewatch ||  || align=right | 1.5 km || 
|-id=694 bgcolor=#E9E9E9
| 613694 ||  || — || December 12, 2006 || Mount Lemmon || Mount Lemmon Survey ||  || align=right data-sort-value="0.80" | 800 m || 
|-id=695 bgcolor=#E9E9E9
| 613695 ||  || — || December 15, 2006 || Kitt Peak || Spacewatch || NEM || align=right | 1.8 km || 
|-id=696 bgcolor=#FA8072
| 613696 ||  || — || December 5, 2006 || Palomar || NEAT ||  || align=right data-sort-value="0.93" | 930 m || 
|-id=697 bgcolor=#E9E9E9
| 613697 ||  || — || December 13, 2006 || Socorro || LINEAR ||  || align=right data-sort-value="0.71" | 710 m || 
|-id=698 bgcolor=#E9E9E9
| 613698 ||  || — || December 18, 2006 || Nyukasa || Mount Nyukasa Stn. ||  || align=right | 1.5 km || 
|-id=699 bgcolor=#FA8072
| 613699 ||  || — || December 24, 2006 || Kitt Peak || Spacewatch ||  || align=right | 1.3 km || 
|-id=700 bgcolor=#E9E9E9
| 613700 ||  || — || December 24, 2006 || Kitt Peak || Spacewatch ||  || align=right | 1.5 km || 
|}

613701–613800 

|-bgcolor=#E9E9E9
| 613701 ||  || — || January 10, 2007 || Mount Lemmon || Mount Lemmon Survey ||  || align=right | 2.2 km || 
|-id=702 bgcolor=#fefefe
| 613702 ||  || — || January 10, 2007 || Kitt Peak || Spacewatch || PHO || align=right data-sort-value="0.60" | 600 m || 
|-id=703 bgcolor=#fefefe
| 613703 ||  || — || January 16, 2007 || Catalina || CSS ||  || align=right | 1.1 km || 
|-id=704 bgcolor=#d6d6d6
| 613704 ||  || — || January 24, 2007 || Mount Lemmon || Mount Lemmon Survey ||  || align=right | 1.6 km || 
|-id=705 bgcolor=#fefefe
| 613705 ||  || — || January 24, 2007 || Mount Lemmon || Mount Lemmon Survey ||  || align=right data-sort-value="0.49" | 490 m || 
|-id=706 bgcolor=#d6d6d6
| 613706 ||  || — || January 24, 2007 || Kitt Peak || Spacewatch ||  || align=right | 2.1 km || 
|-id=707 bgcolor=#E9E9E9
| 613707 ||  || — || February 8, 2007 || Mount Lemmon || Mount Lemmon Survey || HNS || align=right | 1.9 km || 
|-id=708 bgcolor=#E9E9E9
| 613708 ||  || — || February 7, 2007 || Mount Lemmon || Mount Lemmon Survey ||  || align=right data-sort-value="0.54" | 540 m || 
|-id=709 bgcolor=#B88A00
| 613709 ||  || — || February 9, 2007 || Catalina || CSS || Tj (2.86) || align=right | 7.8 km || 
|-id=710 bgcolor=#FA8072
| 613710 ||  || — || February 19, 2007 || Catalina || CSS ||  || align=right | 2.1 km || 
|-id=711 bgcolor=#fefefe
| 613711 ||  || — || February 17, 2007 || Kitt Peak || Spacewatch ||  || align=right data-sort-value="0.70" | 700 m || 
|-id=712 bgcolor=#fefefe
| 613712 ||  || — || February 17, 2007 || Kitt Peak || Spacewatch ||  || align=right data-sort-value="0.69" | 690 m || 
|-id=713 bgcolor=#fefefe
| 613713 ||  || — || February 17, 2007 || Kitt Peak || Spacewatch ||  || align=right data-sort-value="0.54" | 540 m || 
|-id=714 bgcolor=#FFC2E0
| 613714 ||  || — || February 23, 2007 || Mount Lemmon || Mount Lemmon Survey || APOPHA || align=right data-sort-value="0.24" | 240 m || 
|-id=715 bgcolor=#E9E9E9
| 613715 ||  || — || February 19, 2007 || Mount Lemmon || Mount Lemmon Survey ||  || align=right | 1.1 km || 
|-id=716 bgcolor=#E9E9E9
| 613716 ||  || — || February 21, 2007 || Mount Lemmon || Mount Lemmon Survey ||  || align=right | 1.5 km || 
|-id=717 bgcolor=#C7FF8F
| 613717 ||  || — || February 17, 2007 || Kitt Peak || Spacewatch || unusual || align=right | 5.0 km || 
|-id=718 bgcolor=#fefefe
| 613718 ||  || — || February 20, 2007 || Lulin || LUSS ||  || align=right data-sort-value="0.64" | 640 m || 
|-id=719 bgcolor=#fefefe
| 613719 ||  || — || February 21, 2007 || Kitt Peak || Spacewatch ||  || align=right data-sort-value="0.52" | 520 m || 
|-id=720 bgcolor=#E9E9E9
| 613720 ||  || — || February 21, 2007 || Kitt Peak || Spacewatch ||  || align=right | 1.3 km || 
|-id=721 bgcolor=#d6d6d6
| 613721 ||  || — || February 22, 2007 || Calvin-Rehoboth || Calvin–Rehoboth Obs. ||  || align=right | 1.7 km || 
|-id=722 bgcolor=#d6d6d6
| 613722 ||  || — || February 21, 2007 || Mount Lemmon || Mount Lemmon Survey ||  || align=right | 2.1 km || 
|-id=723 bgcolor=#d6d6d6
| 613723 ||  || — || February 25, 2007 || Mount Lemmon || Mount Lemmon Survey ||  || align=right | 2.0 km || 
|-id=724 bgcolor=#fefefe
| 613724 ||  || — || February 25, 2007 || Kitt Peak || Spacewatch ||  || align=right data-sort-value="0.54" | 540 m || 
|-id=725 bgcolor=#d6d6d6
| 613725 ||  || — || February 16, 2007 || Mount Lemmon || Mount Lemmon Survey ||  || align=right | 2.8 km || 
|-id=726 bgcolor=#FFC2E0
| 613726 ||  || — || March 9, 2007 || Mount Lemmon || Mount Lemmon Survey || ATEPHA || align=right data-sort-value="0.26" | 260 m || 
|-id=727 bgcolor=#E9E9E9
| 613727 ||  || — || March 9, 2007 || Catalina || CSS ||  || align=right | 1.6 km || 
|-id=728 bgcolor=#fefefe
| 613728 ||  || — || March 9, 2007 || Mount Lemmon || Mount Lemmon Survey ||  || align=right data-sort-value="0.69" | 690 m || 
|-id=729 bgcolor=#E9E9E9
| 613729 ||  || — || March 10, 2007 || Mount Lemmon || Mount Lemmon Survey ||  || align=right | 3.9 km || 
|-id=730 bgcolor=#fefefe
| 613730 ||  || — || March 9, 2007 || Kitt Peak || Spacewatch ||  || align=right data-sort-value="0.74" | 740 m || 
|-id=731 bgcolor=#fefefe
| 613731 ||  || — || March 12, 2007 || Kitt Peak || Spacewatch ||  || align=right data-sort-value="0.82" | 820 m || 
|-id=732 bgcolor=#fefefe
| 613732 ||  || — || March 12, 2007 || Kitt Peak || Spacewatch ||  || align=right data-sort-value="0.50" | 500 m || 
|-id=733 bgcolor=#fefefe
| 613733 ||  || — || March 12, 2007 || Mount Lemmon || Mount Lemmon Survey || NYS || align=right data-sort-value="0.62" | 620 m || 
|-id=734 bgcolor=#fefefe
| 613734 ||  || — || March 12, 2007 || Mount Lemmon || Mount Lemmon Survey || V || align=right data-sort-value="0.66" | 660 m || 
|-id=735 bgcolor=#FA8072
| 613735 ||  || — || March 12, 2007 || Mount Lemmon || Mount Lemmon Survey ||  || align=right data-sort-value="0.48" | 480 m || 
|-id=736 bgcolor=#fefefe
| 613736 ||  || — || March 14, 2007 || Kitt Peak || Spacewatch ||  || align=right data-sort-value="0.63" | 630 m || 
|-id=737 bgcolor=#fefefe
| 613737 ||  || — || March 9, 2007 || Mount Lemmon || Mount Lemmon Survey ||  || align=right data-sort-value="0.68" | 680 m || 
|-id=738 bgcolor=#FA8072
| 613738 ||  || — || March 19, 2007 || Catalina || CSS ||  || align=right | 1.3 km || 
|-id=739 bgcolor=#fefefe
| 613739 ||  || — || March 16, 2007 || Mount Lemmon || Mount Lemmon Survey ||  || align=right data-sort-value="0.62" | 620 m || 
|-id=740 bgcolor=#d6d6d6
| 613740 ||  || — || March 20, 2007 || Mount Lemmon || Mount Lemmon Survey ||  || align=right | 2.5 km || 
|-id=741 bgcolor=#E9E9E9
| 613741 ||  || — || March 20, 2007 || Mount Lemmon || Mount Lemmon Survey ||  || align=right data-sort-value="0.60" | 600 m || 
|-id=742 bgcolor=#d6d6d6
| 613742 ||  || — || March 20, 2007 || Mount Lemmon || Mount Lemmon Survey ||  || align=right | 1.7 km || 
|-id=743 bgcolor=#E9E9E9
| 613743 ||  || — || April 11, 2007 || Kitt Peak || Spacewatch ||  || align=right | 1.2 km || 
|-id=744 bgcolor=#fefefe
| 613744 ||  || — || April 14, 2007 || Kitt Peak || Spacewatch ||  || align=right data-sort-value="0.49" | 490 m || 
|-id=745 bgcolor=#d6d6d6
| 613745 ||  || — || April 15, 2007 || Kitt Peak || Spacewatch ||  || align=right | 2.0 km || 
|-id=746 bgcolor=#fefefe
| 613746 ||  || — || April 15, 2007 || Kitt Peak || Spacewatch ||  || align=right data-sort-value="0.52" | 520 m || 
|-id=747 bgcolor=#FA8072
| 613747 ||  || — || April 13, 2007 || Mayhill || A. Lowe ||  || align=right data-sort-value="0.53" | 530 m || 
|-id=748 bgcolor=#E9E9E9
| 613748 ||  || — || April 11, 2007 || Catalina || CSS ||  || align=right | 1.6 km || 
|-id=749 bgcolor=#fefefe
| 613749 ||  || — || April 17, 2007 || Pises || Pises Obs. ||  || align=right data-sort-value="0.62" | 620 m || 
|-id=750 bgcolor=#E9E9E9
| 613750 ||  || — || April 19, 2007 || Pla D'Arguines || R. Ferrando ||  || align=right | 1.3 km || 
|-id=751 bgcolor=#E9E9E9
| 613751 ||  || — || April 18, 2007 || Kitt Peak || Spacewatch ||  || align=right | 1.7 km || 
|-id=752 bgcolor=#fefefe
| 613752 ||  || — || April 18, 2007 || Mount Lemmon || Mount Lemmon Survey ||  || align=right data-sort-value="0.52" | 520 m || 
|-id=753 bgcolor=#E9E9E9
| 613753 ||  || — || April 19, 2007 || Kitt Peak || Spacewatch ||  || align=right | 1.2 km || 
|-id=754 bgcolor=#E9E9E9
| 613754 ||  || — || April 18, 2007 || Kitt Peak || Spacewatch ||  || align=right data-sort-value="0.71" | 710 m || 
|-id=755 bgcolor=#E9E9E9
| 613755 ||  || — || May 11, 2007 || Mount Lemmon || Mount Lemmon Survey ||  || align=right | 1.9 km || 
|-id=756 bgcolor=#fefefe
| 613756 ||  || — || May 9, 2007 || Mount Lemmon || Mount Lemmon Survey ||  || align=right data-sort-value="0.62" | 620 m || 
|-id=757 bgcolor=#d6d6d6
| 613757 ||  || — || May 10, 2007 || Kitt Peak || Spacewatch || Tj (2.99) || align=right | 3.6 km || 
|-id=758 bgcolor=#fefefe
| 613758 ||  || — || May 9, 2007 || Anderson Mesa || LONEOS || H || align=right data-sort-value="0.74" | 740 m || 
|-id=759 bgcolor=#E9E9E9
| 613759 ||  || — || June 8, 2007 || Kitt Peak || Spacewatch ||  || align=right | 1.9 km || 
|-id=760 bgcolor=#d6d6d6
| 613760 ||  || — || June 8, 2007 || Kitt Peak || Spacewatch || BRA || align=right | 2.7 km || 
|-id=761 bgcolor=#d6d6d6
| 613761 ||  || — || June 7, 2007 || Kitt Peak || Spacewatch || EUP || align=right | 2.3 km || 
|-id=762 bgcolor=#fefefe
| 613762 ||  || — || June 21, 2007 || Mount Lemmon || Mount Lemmon Survey ||  || align=right data-sort-value="0.71" | 710 m || 
|-id=763 bgcolor=#FFC2E0
| 613763 ||  || — || June 22, 2007 || Catalina || CSS || AMO || align=right data-sort-value="0.32" | 320 m || 
|-id=764 bgcolor=#E9E9E9
| 613764 ||  || — || June 21, 2007 || Kitt Peak || Spacewatch ||  || align=right data-sort-value="0.78" | 780 m || 
|-id=765 bgcolor=#E9E9E9
| 613765 ||  || — || July 14, 2007 || Marly || P. Kocher ||  || align=right | 1.1 km || 
|-id=766 bgcolor=#C2E0FF
| 613766 ||  || — || July 11, 2007 || Palomar Mountain || Palomar Obs. || centaur || align=right | 92 km || 
|-id=767 bgcolor=#E9E9E9
| 613767 ||  || — || August 14, 2007 || Pla D'Arguines || R. Ferrando ||  || align=right data-sort-value="0.99" | 990 m || 
|-id=768 bgcolor=#E9E9E9
| 613768 ||  || — || August 8, 2007 || Socorro || LINEAR ||  || align=right | 1.2 km || 
|-id=769 bgcolor=#E9E9E9
| 613769 ||  || — || August 31, 2007 || Siding Spring || K. Sárneczky, L. Kiss || DOR || align=right | 2.3 km || 
|-id=770 bgcolor=#d6d6d6
| 613770 ||  || — || August 24, 2007 || Kitt Peak || Spacewatch ||  || align=right | 2.1 km || 
|-id=771 bgcolor=#E9E9E9
| 613771 ||  || — || August 23, 2007 || Kitt Peak || Spacewatch ||  || align=right | 1.0 km || 
|-id=772 bgcolor=#fefefe
| 613772 ||  || — || September 1, 2007 || Siding Spring || K. Sárneczky, L. Kiss ||  || align=right data-sort-value="0.85" | 850 m || 
|-id=773 bgcolor=#E9E9E9
| 613773 ||  || — || September 5, 2007 || Dauban || Chante-Perdrix Obs. ||  || align=right | 1.3 km || 
|-id=774 bgcolor=#FA8072
| 613774 ||  || — || September 11, 2007 || Kitt Peak || Spacewatch ||  || align=right data-sort-value="0.57" | 570 m || 
|-id=775 bgcolor=#FFC2E0
| 613775 ||  || — || September 12, 2007 || Catalina || CSS || AMO || align=right data-sort-value="0.34" | 340 m || 
|-id=776 bgcolor=#d6d6d6
| 613776 ||  || — || September 13, 2007 || Altschwendt || W. Ries ||  || align=right | 2.2 km || 
|-id=777 bgcolor=#fefefe
| 613777 ||  || — || September 3, 2007 || Catalina || CSS ||  || align=right data-sort-value="0.50" | 500 m || 
|-id=778 bgcolor=#E9E9E9
| 613778 ||  || — || September 3, 2007 || Catalina || CSS ||  || align=right data-sort-value="0.92" | 920 m || 
|-id=779 bgcolor=#E9E9E9
| 613779 ||  || — || September 5, 2007 || Catalina || CSS ||  || align=right data-sort-value="0.70" | 700 m || 
|-id=780 bgcolor=#E9E9E9
| 613780 ||  || — || September 8, 2007 || Anderson Mesa || LONEOS ||  || align=right | 1.0 km || 
|-id=781 bgcolor=#fefefe
| 613781 ||  || — || September 9, 2007 || Kitt Peak || Spacewatch ||  || align=right data-sort-value="0.47" | 470 m || 
|-id=782 bgcolor=#E9E9E9
| 613782 ||  || — || September 9, 2007 || Anderson Mesa || LONEOS ||  || align=right | 2.4 km || 
|-id=783 bgcolor=#d6d6d6
| 613783 ||  || — || September 10, 2007 || Mount Lemmon || Mount Lemmon Survey || SHU3:2 || align=right | 3.5 km || 
|-id=784 bgcolor=#fefefe
| 613784 ||  || — || September 10, 2007 || Mount Lemmon || Mount Lemmon Survey || NYS || align=right data-sort-value="0.74" | 740 m || 
|-id=785 bgcolor=#E9E9E9
| 613785 ||  || — || September 10, 2007 || Kitt Peak || Spacewatch ||  || align=right | 1.5 km || 
|-id=786 bgcolor=#d6d6d6
| 613786 ||  || — || September 11, 2007 || Kitt Peak || Spacewatch ||  || align=right | 2.4 km || 
|-id=787 bgcolor=#d6d6d6
| 613787 ||  || — || September 11, 2007 || Kitt Peak || Spacewatch ||  || align=right | 2.3 km || 
|-id=788 bgcolor=#fefefe
| 613788 ||  || — || September 11, 2007 || Kitt Peak || Spacewatch ||  || align=right data-sort-value="0.52" | 520 m || 
|-id=789 bgcolor=#fefefe
| 613789 ||  || — || September 11, 2007 || XuYi || PMO NEO ||  || align=right data-sort-value="0.54" | 540 m || 
|-id=790 bgcolor=#d6d6d6
| 613790 ||  || — || September 14, 2007 || Socorro || LINEAR ||  || align=right | 2.1 km || 
|-id=791 bgcolor=#d6d6d6
| 613791 ||  || — || September 9, 2007 || Mount Lemmon || Mount Lemmon Survey || KOR || align=right | 1.8 km || 
|-id=792 bgcolor=#E9E9E9
| 613792 ||  || — || September 10, 2007 || Kitt Peak || Spacewatch ||  || align=right | 1.6 km || 
|-id=793 bgcolor=#E9E9E9
| 613793 ||  || — || September 10, 2007 || Mount Lemmon || Mount Lemmon Survey ||  || align=right | 1.5 km || 
|-id=794 bgcolor=#d6d6d6
| 613794 ||  || — || September 12, 2007 || Mount Lemmon || Mount Lemmon Survey ||  || align=right | 2.5 km || 
|-id=795 bgcolor=#fefefe
| 613795 ||  || — || September 10, 2007 || Kitt Peak || Spacewatch || MAS || align=right data-sort-value="0.63" | 630 m || 
|-id=796 bgcolor=#fefefe
| 613796 ||  || — || September 8, 2007 || Mount Lemmon || Mount Lemmon Survey ||  || align=right | 2.2 km || 
|-id=797 bgcolor=#fefefe
| 613797 ||  || — || September 13, 2007 || Mount Lemmon || Mount Lemmon Survey ||  || align=right | 1.2 km || 
|-id=798 bgcolor=#C2FFFF
| 613798 ||  || — || September 13, 2007 || Mount Lemmon || Mount Lemmon Survey || L4 || align=right | 6.1 km || 
|-id=799 bgcolor=#fefefe
| 613799 ||  || — || September 9, 2007 || Kitt Peak || Spacewatch || V || align=right data-sort-value="0.79" | 790 m || 
|-id=800 bgcolor=#fefefe
| 613800 ||  || — || September 10, 2007 || Kitt Peak || Spacewatch ||  || align=right data-sort-value="0.65" | 650 m || 
|}

613801–613900 

|-bgcolor=#fefefe
| 613801 ||  || — || September 10, 2007 || Kitt Peak || Spacewatch ||  || align=right data-sort-value="0.68" | 680 m || 
|-id=802 bgcolor=#E9E9E9
| 613802 ||  || — || September 14, 2007 || Mount Lemmon || Mount Lemmon Survey ||  || align=right | 1.9 km || 
|-id=803 bgcolor=#E9E9E9
| 613803 ||  || — || September 10, 2007 || Kitt Peak || Spacewatch ||  || align=right data-sort-value="0.46" | 460 m || 
|-id=804 bgcolor=#d6d6d6
| 613804 ||  || — || September 10, 2007 || Kitt Peak || Spacewatch ||  || align=right | 2.7 km || 
|-id=805 bgcolor=#fefefe
| 613805 ||  || — || September 14, 2007 || Kitt Peak || Spacewatch ||  || align=right data-sort-value="0.50" | 500 m || 
|-id=806 bgcolor=#E9E9E9
| 613806 ||  || — || September 14, 2007 || Kitt Peak || Spacewatch ||  || align=right | 1.1 km || 
|-id=807 bgcolor=#fefefe
| 613807 ||  || — || September 14, 2007 || Mount Lemmon || Mount Lemmon Survey ||  || align=right data-sort-value="0.53" | 530 m || 
|-id=808 bgcolor=#d6d6d6
| 613808 ||  || — || September 13, 2007 || Mount Lemmon || Mount Lemmon Survey ||  || align=right | 3.6 km || 
|-id=809 bgcolor=#FA8072
| 613809 ||  || — || September 9, 2007 || Kitt Peak || Spacewatch ||  || align=right data-sort-value="0.43" | 430 m || 
|-id=810 bgcolor=#E9E9E9
| 613810 ||  || — || September 10, 2007 || Kitt Peak || Spacewatch ||  || align=right | 1.5 km || 
|-id=811 bgcolor=#E9E9E9
| 613811 ||  || — || September 12, 2007 || Mount Lemmon || Mount Lemmon Survey ||  || align=right data-sort-value="0.95" | 950 m || 
|-id=812 bgcolor=#fefefe
| 613812 ||  || — || September 11, 2007 || Kitt Peak || Spacewatch ||  || align=right data-sort-value="0.47" | 470 m || 
|-id=813 bgcolor=#E9E9E9
| 613813 ||  || — || September 19, 2007 || Saint-Barthelemy || A. Carbognani ||  || align=right | 1.6 km || 
|-id=814 bgcolor=#FFC2E0
| 613814 ||  || — || September 18, 2007 || Kitt Peak || Spacewatch || APO || align=right data-sort-value="0.32" | 320 m || 
|-id=815 bgcolor=#E9E9E9
| 613815 ||  || — || September 19, 2007 || Kitt Peak || Spacewatch ||  || align=right | 1.5 km || 
|-id=816 bgcolor=#fefefe
| 613816 ||  || — || October 6, 2007 || 7300 || W. K. Y. Yeung ||  || align=right data-sort-value="0.83" | 830 m || 
|-id=817 bgcolor=#fefefe
| 613817 ||  || — || October 6, 2007 || Socorro || LINEAR ||  || align=right data-sort-value="0.64" | 640 m || 
|-id=818 bgcolor=#fefefe
| 613818 ||  || — || October 4, 2007 || Kitt Peak || Spacewatch || (2076) || align=right data-sort-value="0.64" | 640 m || 
|-id=819 bgcolor=#fefefe
| 613819 ||  || — || October 6, 2007 || Kitt Peak || Spacewatch ||  || align=right data-sort-value="0.62" | 620 m || 
|-id=820 bgcolor=#fefefe
| 613820 ||  || — || October 4, 2007 || Catalina || CSS ||  || align=right data-sort-value="0.45" | 450 m || 
|-id=821 bgcolor=#fefefe
| 613821 ||  || — || October 6, 2007 || Kitt Peak || Spacewatch ||  || align=right data-sort-value="0.42" | 420 m || 
|-id=822 bgcolor=#E9E9E9
| 613822 ||  || — || October 7, 2007 || Mount Lemmon || Mount Lemmon Survey ||  || align=right data-sort-value="0.97" | 970 m || 
|-id=823 bgcolor=#fefefe
| 613823 ||  || — || October 4, 2007 || Kitt Peak || Spacewatch || NYS || align=right data-sort-value="0.66" | 660 m || 
|-id=824 bgcolor=#fefefe
| 613824 ||  || — || October 4, 2007 || Kitt Peak || Spacewatch ||  || align=right data-sort-value="0.55" | 550 m || 
|-id=825 bgcolor=#fefefe
| 613825 ||  || — || October 4, 2007 || Kitt Peak || Spacewatch ||  || align=right data-sort-value="0.53" | 530 m || 
|-id=826 bgcolor=#fefefe
| 613826 ||  || — || October 4, 2007 || Kitt Peak || Spacewatch || MAS || align=right data-sort-value="0.60" | 600 m || 
|-id=827 bgcolor=#d6d6d6
| 613827 ||  || — || October 7, 2007 || Mount Lemmon || Mount Lemmon Survey || THM || align=right | 2.1 km || 
|-id=828 bgcolor=#fefefe
| 613828 ||  || — || October 7, 2007 || Mount Lemmon || Mount Lemmon Survey ||  || align=right data-sort-value="0.55" | 550 m || 
|-id=829 bgcolor=#FFC2E0
| 613829 ||  || — || October 12, 2007 || Mount Lemmon || Mount Lemmon Survey || APO || align=right data-sort-value="0.17" | 170 m || 
|-id=830 bgcolor=#fefefe
| 613830 ||  || — || October 5, 2007 || Kitt Peak || Spacewatch ||  || align=right data-sort-value="0.57" | 570 m || 
|-id=831 bgcolor=#fefefe
| 613831 ||  || — || October 8, 2007 || Mount Lemmon || Mount Lemmon Survey ||  || align=right data-sort-value="0.81" | 810 m || 
|-id=832 bgcolor=#d6d6d6
| 613832 ||  || — || October 8, 2007 || Mount Lemmon || Mount Lemmon Survey || KOR || align=right | 1.9 km || 
|-id=833 bgcolor=#d6d6d6
| 613833 ||  || — || October 6, 2007 || Kitt Peak || Spacewatch || LIX || align=right | 1.9 km || 
|-id=834 bgcolor=#E9E9E9
| 613834 ||  || — || October 6, 2007 || Kitt Peak || Spacewatch ||  || align=right data-sort-value="0.62" | 620 m || 
|-id=835 bgcolor=#fefefe
| 613835 ||  || — || October 7, 2007 || Mount Lemmon || Mount Lemmon Survey ||  || align=right data-sort-value="0.81" | 810 m || 
|-id=836 bgcolor=#fefefe
| 613836 ||  || — || October 7, 2007 || Mount Lemmon || Mount Lemmon Survey ||  || align=right data-sort-value="0.80" | 800 m || 
|-id=837 bgcolor=#E9E9E9
| 613837 ||  || — || October 5, 2007 || Kitt Peak || Spacewatch ||  || align=right data-sort-value="0.76" | 760 m || 
|-id=838 bgcolor=#E9E9E9
| 613838 ||  || — || October 13, 2007 || Socorro || LINEAR ||  || align=right | 1.2 km || 
|-id=839 bgcolor=#FA8072
| 613839 ||  || — || October 8, 2007 || Mount Lemmon || Mount Lemmon Survey ||  || align=right data-sort-value="0.99" | 990 m || 
|-id=840 bgcolor=#E9E9E9
| 613840 ||  || — || October 8, 2007 || Mount Lemmon || Mount Lemmon Survey ||  || align=right data-sort-value="0.46" | 460 m || 
|-id=841 bgcolor=#fefefe
| 613841 ||  || — || October 8, 2007 || Kitt Peak || Spacewatch ||  || align=right data-sort-value="0.53" | 530 m || 
|-id=842 bgcolor=#fefefe
| 613842 ||  || — || October 10, 2007 || Kitt Peak || Spacewatch || MAS || align=right data-sort-value="0.69" | 690 m || 
|-id=843 bgcolor=#fefefe
| 613843 ||  || — || October 10, 2007 || Kitt Peak || Spacewatch || MAS || align=right data-sort-value="0.76" | 760 m || 
|-id=844 bgcolor=#fefefe
| 613844 ||  || — || October 9, 2007 || Kitt Peak || Spacewatch || MAS || align=right data-sort-value="0.67" | 670 m || 
|-id=845 bgcolor=#E9E9E9
| 613845 ||  || — || October 11, 2007 || Mount Lemmon || Mount Lemmon Survey ||  || align=right | 1.2 km || 
|-id=846 bgcolor=#E9E9E9
| 613846 ||  || — || October 8, 2007 || Anderson Mesa || LONEOS ||  || align=right | 1.4 km || 
|-id=847 bgcolor=#E9E9E9
| 613847 ||  || — || October 9, 2007 || Mount Lemmon || Mount Lemmon Survey || JUN || align=right | 1.3 km || 
|-id=848 bgcolor=#fefefe
| 613848 ||  || — || October 11, 2007 || Mount Lemmon || Mount Lemmon Survey ||  || align=right data-sort-value="0.46" | 460 m || 
|-id=849 bgcolor=#E9E9E9
| 613849 ||  || — || October 11, 2007 || Kitt Peak || Spacewatch ||  || align=right | 1.3 km || 
|-id=850 bgcolor=#E9E9E9
| 613850 ||  || — || October 11, 2007 || Kitt Peak || Spacewatch ||  || align=right data-sort-value="0.50" | 500 m || 
|-id=851 bgcolor=#E9E9E9
| 613851 ||  || — || October 10, 2007 || Mount Lemmon || Mount Lemmon Survey ||  || align=right data-sort-value="0.56" | 560 m || 
|-id=852 bgcolor=#E9E9E9
| 613852 ||  || — || October 14, 2007 || Mount Lemmon || Mount Lemmon Survey ||  || align=right data-sort-value="0.82" | 820 m || 
|-id=853 bgcolor=#fefefe
| 613853 ||  || — || October 14, 2007 || Mount Lemmon || Mount Lemmon Survey ||  || align=right data-sort-value="0.51" | 510 m || 
|-id=854 bgcolor=#fefefe
| 613854 ||  || — || October 14, 2007 || Kitt Peak || Spacewatch ||  || align=right data-sort-value="0.75" | 750 m || 
|-id=855 bgcolor=#E9E9E9
| 613855 ||  || — || October 15, 2007 || Kitt Peak || Spacewatch ||  || align=right data-sort-value="0.99" | 990 m || 
|-id=856 bgcolor=#d6d6d6
| 613856 ||  || — || October 14, 2007 || Catalina || CSS || THB || align=right | 2.7 km || 
|-id=857 bgcolor=#C2E0FF
| 613857 ||  || — || October 4, 2007 || Cerro Tololo || Cerro Tololo Obs. || other TNOcritical || align=right | 139 km || 
|-id=858 bgcolor=#C2E0FF
| 613858 ||  || — || October 4, 2007 || Cerro Tololo || Cerro Tololo Obs. || SDOcritical || align=right | 159 km || 
|-id=859 bgcolor=#fefefe
| 613859 ||  || — || October 8, 2007 || Mount Lemmon || Mount Lemmon Survey ||  || align=right data-sort-value="0.67" | 670 m || 
|-id=860 bgcolor=#d6d6d6
| 613860 ||  || — || October 8, 2007 || Mount Lemmon || Mount Lemmon Survey || URS || align=right | 4.2 km || 
|-id=861 bgcolor=#E9E9E9
| 613861 ||  || — || October 4, 2007 || Kitt Peak || Spacewatch ||  || align=right data-sort-value="0.60" | 600 m || 
|-id=862 bgcolor=#FFC2E0
| 613862 ||  || — || October 18, 2007 || Catalina || CSS || ATE || align=right data-sort-value="0.085" | 85 m || 
|-id=863 bgcolor=#E9E9E9
| 613863 ||  || — || October 22, 2007 || Gnosca || S. Sposetti ||  || align=right data-sort-value="0.86" | 860 m || 
|-id=864 bgcolor=#d6d6d6
| 613864 ||  || — || October 18, 2007 || Mount Lemmon || Mount Lemmon Survey ||  || align=right | 2.1 km || 
|-id=865 bgcolor=#fefefe
| 613865 ||  || — || October 16, 2007 || Kitt Peak || Spacewatch ||  || align=right data-sort-value="0.62" | 620 m || 
|-id=866 bgcolor=#E9E9E9
| 613866 ||  || — || October 20, 2007 || Catalina || CSS ||  || align=right | 1.3 km || 
|-id=867 bgcolor=#E9E9E9
| 613867 ||  || — || October 18, 2007 || Kitt Peak || Spacewatch ||  || align=right | 1.2 km || 
|-id=868 bgcolor=#fefefe
| 613868 ||  || — || October 30, 2007 || Kitt Peak || Spacewatch ||  || align=right data-sort-value="0.70" | 700 m || 
|-id=869 bgcolor=#E9E9E9
| 613869 ||  || — || October 30, 2007 || Mount Lemmon || Mount Lemmon Survey ||  || align=right | 1.2 km || 
|-id=870 bgcolor=#d6d6d6
| 613870 ||  || — || October 30, 2007 || Mount Lemmon || Mount Lemmon Survey || KOR || align=right | 1.8 km || 
|-id=871 bgcolor=#fefefe
| 613871 ||  || — || October 30, 2007 || Mount Lemmon || Mount Lemmon Survey ||  || align=right data-sort-value="0.50" | 500 m || 
|-id=872 bgcolor=#FA8072
| 613872 ||  || — || October 30, 2007 || Kitt Peak || Spacewatch ||  || align=right data-sort-value="0.48" | 480 m || 
|-id=873 bgcolor=#E9E9E9
| 613873 ||  || — || October 31, 2007 || Mount Lemmon || Mount Lemmon Survey ||  || align=right | 1.2 km || 
|-id=874 bgcolor=#E9E9E9
| 613874 ||  || — || October 18, 2007 || Mount Lemmon || Mount Lemmon Survey ||  || align=right | 2.4 km || 
|-id=875 bgcolor=#fefefe
| 613875 ||  || — || November 1, 2007 || Mount Lemmon || Mount Lemmon Survey ||  || align=right data-sort-value="0.52" | 520 m || 
|-id=876 bgcolor=#E9E9E9
| 613876 ||  || — || November 1, 2007 || Mount Lemmon || Mount Lemmon Survey ||  || align=right data-sort-value="0.91" | 910 m || 
|-id=877 bgcolor=#E9E9E9
| 613877 ||  || — || November 1, 2007 || Kitt Peak || Spacewatch ||  || align=right | 1.1 km || 
|-id=878 bgcolor=#FA8072
| 613878 ||  || — || November 2, 2007 || Mount Lemmon || Mount Lemmon Survey ||  || align=right data-sort-value="0.69" | 690 m || 
|-id=879 bgcolor=#fefefe
| 613879 ||  || — || November 2, 2007 || Kitt Peak || Spacewatch ||  || align=right data-sort-value="0.64" | 640 m || 
|-id=880 bgcolor=#FA8072
| 613880 ||  || — || November 3, 2007 || Kitt Peak || Spacewatch ||  || align=right data-sort-value="0.49" | 490 m || 
|-id=881 bgcolor=#d6d6d6
| 613881 ||  || — || November 3, 2007 || Kitt Peak || Spacewatch ||  || align=right | 2.3 km || 
|-id=882 bgcolor=#fefefe
| 613882 ||  || — || November 4, 2007 || Kitt Peak || Spacewatch || H || align=right data-sort-value="0.60" | 600 m || 
|-id=883 bgcolor=#FA8072
| 613883 ||  || — || November 2, 2007 || Mount Lemmon || Mount Lemmon Survey || H || align=right data-sort-value="0.66" | 660 m || 
|-id=884 bgcolor=#E9E9E9
| 613884 ||  || — || November 1, 2007 || Kitt Peak || Spacewatch ||  || align=right | 1.3 km || 
|-id=885 bgcolor=#fefefe
| 613885 ||  || — || November 3, 2007 || Kitt Peak || Spacewatch ||  || align=right data-sort-value="0.59" | 590 m || 
|-id=886 bgcolor=#E9E9E9
| 613886 ||  || — || November 3, 2007 || Kitt Peak || Spacewatch ||  || align=right | 1.9 km || 
|-id=887 bgcolor=#fefefe
| 613887 ||  || — || November 3, 2007 || Kitt Peak || Spacewatch ||  || align=right data-sort-value="0.53" | 530 m || 
|-id=888 bgcolor=#fefefe
| 613888 ||  || — || November 3, 2007 || Kitt Peak || Spacewatch || MAS || align=right data-sort-value="0.55" | 550 m || 
|-id=889 bgcolor=#d6d6d6
| 613889 ||  || — || November 5, 2007 || Kitt Peak || Spacewatch ||  || align=right | 1.9 km || 
|-id=890 bgcolor=#E9E9E9
| 613890 ||  || — || November 5, 2007 || Mount Lemmon || Mount Lemmon Survey ||  || align=right data-sort-value="0.75" | 750 m || 
|-id=891 bgcolor=#d6d6d6
| 613891 ||  || — || November 5, 2007 || Mount Lemmon || Mount Lemmon Survey || EOS || align=right | 2.3 km || 
|-id=892 bgcolor=#fefefe
| 613892 ||  || — || November 1, 2007 || Mount Lemmon || Mount Lemmon Survey || MAS || align=right data-sort-value="0.69" | 690 m || 
|-id=893 bgcolor=#fefefe
| 613893 ||  || — || November 4, 2007 || Kitt Peak || Spacewatch ||  || align=right data-sort-value="0.57" | 570 m || 
|-id=894 bgcolor=#fefefe
| 613894 ||  || — || November 5, 2007 || Kitt Peak || Spacewatch ||  || align=right data-sort-value="0.42" | 420 m || 
|-id=895 bgcolor=#E9E9E9
| 613895 ||  || — || November 7, 2007 || Catalina || CSS ||  || align=right data-sort-value="0.66" | 660 m || 
|-id=896 bgcolor=#E9E9E9
| 613896 ||  || — || November 4, 2007 || Kitt Peak || Spacewatch ||  || align=right data-sort-value="0.64" | 640 m || 
|-id=897 bgcolor=#d6d6d6
| 613897 ||  || — || November 5, 2007 || Kitt Peak || Spacewatch || EOS || align=right | 2.7 km || 
|-id=898 bgcolor=#E9E9E9
| 613898 ||  || — || November 5, 2007 || Kitt Peak || Spacewatch ||  || align=right | 1.5 km || 
|-id=899 bgcolor=#E9E9E9
| 613899 ||  || — || November 7, 2007 || Kitt Peak || Spacewatch ||  || align=right data-sort-value="0.69" | 690 m || 
|-id=900 bgcolor=#fefefe
| 613900 ||  || — || November 7, 2007 || Kitt Peak || Spacewatch ||  || align=right data-sort-value="0.51" | 510 m || 
|}

613901–614000 

|-bgcolor=#fefefe
| 613901 ||  || — || November 8, 2007 || Mount Lemmon || Mount Lemmon Survey || NYS || align=right data-sort-value="0.69" | 690 m || 
|-id=902 bgcolor=#fefefe
| 613902 ||  || — || November 9, 2007 || Mount Lemmon || Mount Lemmon Survey || MAS || align=right data-sort-value="0.66" | 660 m || 
|-id=903 bgcolor=#E9E9E9
| 613903 ||  || — || November 7, 2007 || Kitt Peak || Spacewatch ||  || align=right | 1.2 km || 
|-id=904 bgcolor=#d6d6d6
| 613904 ||  || — || November 13, 2007 || Mount Lemmon || Mount Lemmon Survey ||  || align=right | 2.1 km || 
|-id=905 bgcolor=#E9E9E9
| 613905 ||  || — || November 11, 2007 || Mount Lemmon || Mount Lemmon Survey ||  || align=right | 1.1 km || 
|-id=906 bgcolor=#fefefe
| 613906 ||  || — || November 14, 2007 || Kitt Peak || Spacewatch ||  || align=right data-sort-value="0.69" | 690 m || 
|-id=907 bgcolor=#fefefe
| 613907 ||  || — || November 14, 2007 || Kitt Peak || Spacewatch ||  || align=right data-sort-value="0.68" | 680 m || 
|-id=908 bgcolor=#C2E0FF
| 613908 ||  || — || November 2, 2007 || Apache Point || Apache Point Obs. || SDOcritical || align=right | 230 km || 
|-id=909 bgcolor=#E9E9E9
| 613909 ||  || — || November 15, 2007 || Socorro || LINEAR ||  || align=right | 1.4 km || 
|-id=910 bgcolor=#FFC2E0
| 613910 ||  || — || November 20, 2007 || Mount Lemmon || Mount Lemmon Survey || APO || align=right data-sort-value="0.54" | 540 m || 
|-id=911 bgcolor=#fefefe
| 613911 ||  || — || November 18, 2007 || Mount Lemmon || Mount Lemmon Survey ||  || align=right data-sort-value="0.51" | 510 m || 
|-id=912 bgcolor=#fefefe
| 613912 ||  || — || November 20, 2007 || Mount Lemmon || Mount Lemmon Survey ||  || align=right data-sort-value="0.63" | 630 m || 
|-id=913 bgcolor=#FFC2E0
| 613913 ||  || — || December 5, 2007 || Kitt Peak || Spacewatch || APO +1km || align=right | 1.0 km || 
|-id=914 bgcolor=#fefefe
| 613914 ||  || — || December 5, 2007 || Bisei SG Center || BATTeRS ||  || align=right data-sort-value="0.66" | 660 m || 
|-id=915 bgcolor=#E9E9E9
| 613915 ||  || — || December 10, 2007 || Great Shefford || P. Birtwhistle ||  || align=right data-sort-value="0.81" | 810 m || 
|-id=916 bgcolor=#E9E9E9
| 613916 ||  || — || December 15, 2007 || Kitt Peak || Spacewatch ||  || align=right data-sort-value="0.85" | 850 m || 
|-id=917 bgcolor=#E9E9E9
| 613917 ||  || — || December 5, 2007 || Kitt Peak || Spacewatch ||  || align=right | 1.2 km || 
|-id=918 bgcolor=#d6d6d6
| 613918 ||  || — || December 17, 2007 || Catalina || CSS || Tj (2.61) || align=right | 5.5 km || 
|-id=919 bgcolor=#E9E9E9
| 613919 ||  || — || December 17, 2007 || Mount Lemmon || Mount Lemmon Survey ||  || align=right | 1.8 km || 
|-id=920 bgcolor=#E9E9E9
| 613920 ||  || — || December 28, 2007 || Kitt Peak || Spacewatch ||  || align=right data-sort-value="0.58" | 580 m || 
|-id=921 bgcolor=#E9E9E9
| 613921 ||  || — || December 28, 2007 || Kitt Peak || Spacewatch ||  || align=right | 1.1 km || 
|-id=922 bgcolor=#E9E9E9
| 613922 ||  || — || December 31, 2007 || Catalina || CSS ||  || align=right | 1.4 km || 
|-id=923 bgcolor=#d6d6d6
| 613923 ||  || — || December 30, 2007 || Mount Lemmon || Mount Lemmon Survey ||  || align=right | 2.6 km || 
|-id=924 bgcolor=#d6d6d6
| 613924 ||  || — || December 30, 2007 || Mount Lemmon || Mount Lemmon Survey ||  || align=right | 2.3 km || 
|-id=925 bgcolor=#E9E9E9
| 613925 ||  || — || December 30, 2007 || Mount Lemmon || Mount Lemmon Survey ||  || align=right data-sort-value="0.62" | 620 m || 
|-id=926 bgcolor=#d6d6d6
| 613926 ||  || — || December 30, 2007 || Mount Lemmon || Mount Lemmon Survey ||  || align=right | 2.7 km || 
|-id=927 bgcolor=#E9E9E9
| 613927 ||  || — || January 10, 2008 || Mount Lemmon || Mount Lemmon Survey ||  || align=right | 1.6 km || 
|-id=928 bgcolor=#E9E9E9
| 613928 ||  || — || January 10, 2008 || Kitt Peak || Spacewatch || (194) || align=right | 1.3 km || 
|-id=929 bgcolor=#E9E9E9
| 613929 ||  || — || January 10, 2008 || Kitt Peak || Spacewatch ||  || align=right | 1.2 km || 
|-id=930 bgcolor=#E9E9E9
| 613930 ||  || — || January 10, 2008 || Mount Lemmon || Mount Lemmon Survey ||  || align=right data-sort-value="0.64" | 640 m || 
|-id=931 bgcolor=#fefefe
| 613931 ||  || — || January 10, 2008 || Kitt Peak || Spacewatch ||  || align=right data-sort-value="0.70" | 700 m || 
|-id=932 bgcolor=#E9E9E9
| 613932 ||  || — || January 11, 2008 || Kitt Peak || Spacewatch ||  || align=right data-sort-value="0.75" | 750 m || 
|-id=933 bgcolor=#E9E9E9
| 613933 ||  || — || January 15, 2008 || Kitt Peak || Spacewatch ||  || align=right data-sort-value="0.73" | 730 m || 
|-id=934 bgcolor=#E9E9E9
| 613934 ||  || — || January 14, 2008 || Kitt Peak || Spacewatch ||  || align=right data-sort-value="0.77" | 770 m || 
|-id=935 bgcolor=#E9E9E9
| 613935 ||  || — || January 31, 2008 || Catalina || CSS ||  || align=right | 1.0 km || 
|-id=936 bgcolor=#fefefe
| 613936 ||  || — || January 30, 2008 || Mount Lemmon || Mount Lemmon Survey || MAS || align=right data-sort-value="0.55" | 550 m || 
|-id=937 bgcolor=#E9E9E9
| 613937 ||  || — || February 6, 2008 || Catalina || CSS ||  || align=right | 1.7 km || 
|-id=938 bgcolor=#E9E9E9
| 613938 ||  || — || February 8, 2008 || Mount Lemmon || Mount Lemmon Survey ||  || align=right | 1.5 km || 
|-id=939 bgcolor=#FFC2E0
| 613939 ||  || — || February 9, 2008 || Mount Lemmon || Mount Lemmon Survey || ATE || align=right data-sort-value="0.32" | 320 m || 
|-id=940 bgcolor=#FFC2E0
| 613940 ||  || — || February 12, 2008 || Catalina || CSS || AMO || align=right data-sort-value="0.70" | 700 m || 
|-id=941 bgcolor=#d6d6d6
| 613941 ||  || — || February 8, 2008 || Kitt Peak || Spacewatch || TIR || align=right | 2.5 km || 
|-id=942 bgcolor=#d6d6d6
| 613942 ||  || — || February 8, 2008 || Kitt Peak || Spacewatch || 3:2 || align=right | 3.7 km || 
|-id=943 bgcolor=#E9E9E9
| 613943 ||  || — || February 9, 2008 || Kitt Peak || Spacewatch ||  || align=right | 1.2 km || 
|-id=944 bgcolor=#E9E9E9
| 613944 ||  || — || February 9, 2008 || Kitt Peak || Spacewatch ||  || align=right | 1.2 km || 
|-id=945 bgcolor=#fefefe
| 613945 ||  || — || February 9, 2008 || Kitt Peak || Spacewatch ||  || align=right data-sort-value="0.63" | 630 m || 
|-id=946 bgcolor=#d6d6d6
| 613946 ||  || — || February 9, 2008 || Kitt Peak || Spacewatch ||  || align=right | 2.0 km || 
|-id=947 bgcolor=#d6d6d6
| 613947 ||  || — || February 9, 2008 || Kitt Peak || Spacewatch ||  || align=right | 2.1 km || 
|-id=948 bgcolor=#E9E9E9
| 613948 ||  || — || February 10, 2008 || Kitt Peak || Spacewatch ||  || align=right data-sort-value="0.64" | 640 m || 
|-id=949 bgcolor=#FFC2E0
| 613949 ||  || — || February 14, 2008 || Catalina || CSS || ATE || align=right data-sort-value="0.18" | 180 m || 
|-id=950 bgcolor=#E9E9E9
| 613950 ||  || — || February 13, 2008 || Mount Lemmon || Mount Lemmon Survey ||  || align=right | 1.5 km || 
|-id=951 bgcolor=#E9E9E9
| 613951 ||  || — || February 9, 2008 || Kitt Peak || Spacewatch ||  || align=right | 2.1 km || 
|-id=952 bgcolor=#E9E9E9
| 613952 ||  || — || February 13, 2008 || Kitt Peak || Spacewatch ||  || align=right | 1.2 km || 
|-id=953 bgcolor=#fefefe
| 613953 ||  || — || February 29, 2008 || Kitt Peak || Spacewatch ||  || align=right data-sort-value="0.67" | 670 m || 
|-id=954 bgcolor=#fefefe
| 613954 ||  || — || February 28, 2008 || Mount Lemmon || Mount Lemmon Survey ||  || align=right data-sort-value="0.56" | 560 m || 
|-id=955 bgcolor=#FA8072
| 613955 ||  || — || March 6, 2008 || Kitt Peak || Spacewatch ||  || align=right data-sort-value="0.34" | 340 m || 
|-id=956 bgcolor=#E9E9E9
| 613956 ||  || — || March 1, 2008 || Kitt Peak || Spacewatch ||  || align=right data-sort-value="0.91" | 910 m || 
|-id=957 bgcolor=#fefefe
| 613957 ||  || — || March 1, 2008 || Kitt Peak || Spacewatch || NYS || align=right data-sort-value="0.63" | 630 m || 
|-id=958 bgcolor=#E9E9E9
| 613958 ||  || — || March 4, 2008 || Kitt Peak || Spacewatch ||  || align=right | 1.9 km || 
|-id=959 bgcolor=#FFC2E0
| 613959 ||  || — || March 11, 2008 || Mount Lemmon || Mount Lemmon Survey || AMO || align=right data-sort-value="0.27" | 270 m || 
|-id=960 bgcolor=#fefefe
| 613960 ||  || — || March 11, 2008 || Kitt Peak || Spacewatch ||  || align=right data-sort-value="0.45" | 450 m || 
|-id=961 bgcolor=#d6d6d6
| 613961 ||  || — || March 10, 2008 || Kitt Peak || Spacewatch ||  || align=right | 3.4 km || 
|-id=962 bgcolor=#d6d6d6
| 613962 ||  || — || March 15, 2008 || Mount Lemmon || Mount Lemmon Survey || EOS || align=right | 1.9 km || 
|-id=963 bgcolor=#d6d6d6
| 613963 ||  || — || March 1, 2008 || Kitt Peak || Spacewatch || Tj (2.98) || align=right | 2.2 km || 
|-id=964 bgcolor=#FFC2E0
| 613964 ||  || — || March 27, 2008 || Mount Lemmon || Mount Lemmon Survey || APO || align=right data-sort-value="0.70" | 700 m || 
|-id=965 bgcolor=#d6d6d6
| 613965 ||  || — || March 25, 2008 || Kitt Peak || Spacewatch ||  || align=right | 1.9 km || 
|-id=966 bgcolor=#E9E9E9
| 613966 ||  || — || March 26, 2008 || Kitt Peak || Spacewatch || ADE || align=right | 1.2 km || 
|-id=967 bgcolor=#fefefe
| 613967 ||  || — || March 27, 2008 || Kitt Peak || Spacewatch ||  || align=right data-sort-value="0.54" | 540 m || 
|-id=968 bgcolor=#E9E9E9
| 613968 ||  || — || March 28, 2008 || Mount Lemmon || Mount Lemmon Survey ||  || align=right data-sort-value="0.96" | 960 m || 
|-id=969 bgcolor=#fefefe
| 613969 ||  || — || March 28, 2008 || Mount Lemmon || Mount Lemmon Survey || NYS || align=right data-sort-value="0.63" | 630 m || 
|-id=970 bgcolor=#E9E9E9
| 613970 ||  || — || March 30, 2008 || Mayhill || W. G. Dillon ||  || align=right | 1.7 km || 
|-id=971 bgcolor=#E9E9E9
| 613971 ||  || — || March 30, 2008 || Kitt Peak || Spacewatch || KON || align=right data-sort-value="0.67" | 670 m || 
|-id=972 bgcolor=#d6d6d6
| 613972 ||  || — || March 31, 2008 || Mount Lemmon || Mount Lemmon Survey || Tj (2.96) || align=right | 1.9 km || 
|-id=973 bgcolor=#fefefe
| 613973 ||  || — || March 28, 2008 || Mount Lemmon || Mount Lemmon Survey ||  || align=right data-sort-value="0.60" | 600 m || 
|-id=974 bgcolor=#E9E9E9
| 613974 ||  || — || March 30, 2008 || Catalina || CSS ||  || align=right | 1.7 km || 
|-id=975 bgcolor=#fefefe
| 613975 ||  || — || March 26, 2008 || Mount Lemmon || Mount Lemmon Survey ||  || align=right data-sort-value="0.52" | 520 m || 
|-id=976 bgcolor=#E9E9E9
| 613976 ||  || — || April 3, 2008 || Mount Lemmon || Mount Lemmon Survey ||  || align=right data-sort-value="0.93" | 930 m || 
|-id=977 bgcolor=#d6d6d6
| 613977 ||  || — || April 4, 2008 || Kitt Peak || Spacewatch ||  || align=right | 1.9 km || 
|-id=978 bgcolor=#fefefe
| 613978 ||  || — || April 5, 2008 || Mount Lemmon || Mount Lemmon Survey ||  || align=right data-sort-value="0.65" | 650 m || 
|-id=979 bgcolor=#E9E9E9
| 613979 ||  || — || April 6, 2008 || Kitt Peak || Spacewatch ||  || align=right data-sort-value="0.76" | 760 m || 
|-id=980 bgcolor=#E9E9E9
| 613980 ||  || — || April 6, 2008 || Mount Lemmon || Mount Lemmon Survey ||  || align=right | 1.7 km || 
|-id=981 bgcolor=#fefefe
| 613981 ||  || — || April 10, 2008 || Kitt Peak || Spacewatch || H || align=right data-sort-value="0.60" | 600 m || 
|-id=982 bgcolor=#E9E9E9
| 613982 ||  || — || April 13, 2008 || Kitt Peak || Spacewatch ||  || align=right | 1.7 km || 
|-id=983 bgcolor=#d6d6d6
| 613983 ||  || — || April 14, 2008 || Mount Lemmon || Mount Lemmon Survey ||  || align=right | 2.3 km || 
|-id=984 bgcolor=#d6d6d6
| 613984 ||  || — || April 24, 2008 || Kitt Peak || Spacewatch ||  || align=right | 1.9 km || 
|-id=985 bgcolor=#FFC2E0
| 613985 ||  || — || April 30, 2008 || Mount Lemmon || Mount Lemmon Survey || AMO || align=right data-sort-value="0.31" | 310 m || 
|-id=986 bgcolor=#FFC2E0
| 613986 ||  || — || May 1, 2008 || Catalina || CSS || APOPHA || align=right data-sort-value="0.24" | 240 m || 
|-id=987 bgcolor=#B88A00
| 613987 ||  || — || May 8, 2008 || Mount Lemmon || Mount Lemmon Survey || Tj (2.83) || align=right | 1.9 km || 
|-id=988 bgcolor=#fefefe
| 613988 ||  || — || May 28, 2008 || Kitt Peak || Spacewatch ||  || align=right data-sort-value="0.43" | 430 m || 
|-id=989 bgcolor=#d6d6d6
| 613989 ||  || — || May 28, 2008 || Kitt Peak || Spacewatch || Tj (2.99) || align=right | 3.2 km || 
|-id=990 bgcolor=#E9E9E9
| 613990 ||  || — || May 28, 2008 || Kitt Peak || Spacewatch ||  || align=right | 2.8 km || 
|-id=991 bgcolor=#fefefe
| 613991 ||  || — || May 27, 2008 || Kitt Peak || Spacewatch || MAS || align=right data-sort-value="0.56" | 560 m || 
|-id=992 bgcolor=#E9E9E9
| 613992 ||  || — || May 27, 2008 || Kitt Peak || Spacewatch ||  || align=right | 1.6 km || 
|-id=993 bgcolor=#fefefe
| 613993 ||  || — || May 30, 2008 || Kitt Peak || Spacewatch ||  || align=right data-sort-value="0.54" | 540 m || 
|-id=994 bgcolor=#d6d6d6
| 613994 ||  || — || May 31, 2008 || Kitt Peak || Spacewatch ||  || align=right | 2.6 km || 
|-id=995 bgcolor=#FFC2E0
| 613995 ||  || — || July 14, 2008 || Siding Spring || SSS || APO || align=right data-sort-value="0.19" | 190 m || 
|-id=996 bgcolor=#E9E9E9
| 613996 ||  || — || July 29, 2008 || Kitt Peak || Spacewatch ||  || align=right data-sort-value="0.69" | 690 m || 
|-id=997 bgcolor=#E9E9E9
| 613997 ||  || — || July 30, 2008 || Kitt Peak || Spacewatch ||  || align=right data-sort-value="0.65" | 650 m || 
|-id=998 bgcolor=#E9E9E9
| 613998 ||  || — || August 5, 2008 || Hibiscus || S. F. Hönig, N. Teamo ||  || align=right data-sort-value="0.93" | 930 m || 
|-id=999 bgcolor=#fefefe
| 613999 ||  || — || August 5, 2008 || Vicques || M. Ory ||  || align=right data-sort-value="0.56" | 560 m || 
|-id=000 bgcolor=#E9E9E9
| 614000 ||  || — || August 7, 2008 || Kitt Peak || Spacewatch || MIS || align=right | 1.1 km || 
|}

References

External links 
 Discovery Circumstances: Numbered Minor Planets (610001)–(615000) (IAU Minor Planet Center)

0613